= Minister of State (Netherlands) =

The Minister of State (Dutch: Minister van Staat) is an honorary title in the Netherlands. The title is formally granted together with the style Excellency, by the Monarch, but on the initiative of the cabinet of the Netherlands. It is given on a personal basis, for life rather than for a specified period. The title is granted for exceptional merits, generally to senior politicians at the end of their party career. Ministers of state are often former cabinet members or party leaders. Ministers of State advise the Sovereign in delicate situations, with moral authority but without formal competence. A Minister of State is not part of a cabinet, but may be asked to represent the government for certain events. The Ministers of State have a diplomatic passport. Before World War II it was common for Ministers of State to still have a public function, some notable as Pieter Cort van der Linden and Hendrikus Colijn, were Minister of State while they served as Prime Minister of the Netherlands. After World War II, Louis Beel was the only person who still sat in the cabinet while he was Minister of State.

== Current ministers of state ==
Portrait	Name	Appointed	Party	Office(s)
Johan Remkes	Johan Remkes (born 1951)	10 July 2026 (0 days)	VVD	Member of the House of Representatives (1993–1998, 2002, 2003, 2006–2010); State Secretary for Housing, Spatial Planning and the Environment (1998–2002); Deputy Prime Minister (2002–2003); Minister of the Interior and Kingdom Relations (2002–2007); King's Commissioner of North Holland (2010–2019)
Thom de Graaf	Thom de Graaf (born 1957)	10 July 2026 (0 days)	D66	Member of the House of Representatives (1994–2003); Minister for Governmental Reform and Kingdom Relations (2003–2005); Deputy Prime Minister (2003–2005); Mayor of Nijmegen (2007–2012); Member of the Senate (2011–2018); Vice-President of the Council of State (2018–2026)
Frans Timmermans	Frans Timmermans (born 1961)	10 July 2026 (0 days)	PvdA	Member of the House of Representatives (1998–2007, 2010–2012, 2023–2025); State Secretary for European Affairs (2007–2010); Minister of Foreign Affairs (2012–2014); European Commissioner for Better Regulation, Interinstitutional Relations, Rule of Law and Charter of Fundamental Rights (2014–2019); First Vice-President of the European Commission (2014–2019); European Commissioner for Climate Action (2019–2023); Executive Vice-President of the European Commission for the European Green Deal (2019–2023)
Herman Tjeenk Willink	Herman Tjeenk Willink (born 1942)	21 December 2012 (13 years, 201 days)	PvdA	Member of the Senate (1987–1997); President of the Senate (1991–1997); Vice-President of the Council of State (1997–2012)
Winnie Sorgdrager	Winnie Sorgdrager (born 1948)	22 June 2018 (8 years, 18 days)	D66	Minister of Justice (1994–1998); Member of the Senate (1999); Member of the Council of State (2006–2018)
Jaap de Hoop Scheffer	Jaap de Hoop Scheffer (born 1948)	22 June 2018 (8 years, 18 days)	CDA	Member of the House of Representatives (1986–2002); Minister of Foreign Affairs (2002–2003); Secretary General of NATO (2004–2009)
Sybilla Dekker	Sybilla Dekker (born 1942)	22 June 2018 (8 years, 18 days)	VVD	Minister of Housing, Spatial Planning and the Environment (2003–2006)
Piet Hein Donner	Piet Hein Donner (born 1948)	21 December 2018 (7 years, 201 days)	CDA	Member of the Scientific Council for Government Policy (1990–1993); Director of the Scientific Council for Government Policy (1993–1997); Member of the Council of State (1997–2002); Minister of Justice (2002–2006); Member of the House of Representatives (2006–2007); Minister of Social Affairs and Employment (2007–2010); Minister of the Interior and Kingdom Relations (2010–2012); Vice-President of the Council of State (2012–2018)
Jan Peter Balkenende	Jan Peter Balkenende (born 1956)	14 October 2022 (3 years, 269 days)	CDA	Member of the House of Representatives (1998–2002, 2003, 2006–2007); Prime Minister (2002–2010)

== Historical Ministers of State ==
Portrait	Name	Appointed	Party	Office(s)
Jos van Kemenade	Dr. Jos van Kemenade (1937–2020)	5 April 2002	PvdA	Minister of Education and Sciences (1973–1977, 1981–1982); Member of the House of Representatives (1977, 1978–1981, 1982–1984); Mayor of Eindhoven (1988–1992); Queen's Commissioner of North Holland (1992–2002)
Wim Kok	Wim Kok (1938–2018)	11 April 2003	PvdA	Member of the Social and Economic Council (1972–1986); Member of the House of Representatives (1986–1989, 1994, 1998); Minister of Finance (1989–1994); Deputy Prime Minister (1989–1994); Prime Minister (1994–2002)
Ruud Lubbers	Ruud Lubbers (1939–2018)	31 January 1995	CDA	Minister of Economic Affairs (1973–1977); Prime Minister (1982–1994); Minister for Netherlands Antilles and Aruba Affairs (1989, 1994); Member of the House of Representatives (1977, 1977–1982, 1986, 1989)
Hans van den Broek	Hans van den Broek (1936–2025)	25 February 2005	CDA	Member of the House of Representatives (1976–1981, 1982, 1986, 1989); State Secretary for Foreign Affairs (1981–1982); Minister of Foreign Affairs (1982–1993); European Commissioner (1993–1999)
Els Borst	Dr. Els Borst (1932–2014)	21 December 2012	D66	Member of the Health Council (1986–1994); Minister of Health, Welfare and Sport (1994–2002); Member of the House of Representatives (1998); Deputy Prime Minister (1998–2002)
Pieter Kooijmans	Dr. Pieter Kooijmans (1933–2013)	13 July 2007	CDA	State Secretary for Foreign Affairs (1973–1977); Minister of Foreign Affairs (1993–1994)
Max van der Stoel	Max van der Stoel (1924–2011)	17 May 1991	PvdA	Member of the Senate (1960–1963); Member of the House of Representatives (1963–1965, 1967–1973, 1977, 1978–1981); State Secretary for Foreign Affairs (1965–1966); Member of the European Parliament (1971–1973); Minister of Foreign Affairs (1973–1977, 1981–1982); Ambassador to the United Nations (1983–1986); Member of the Council of State (1986–1993)
Hans van Mierlo	Hans van Mierlo (1931–2010)	24 October 1998	D66	Member of the House of Representatives (1967–1977, 1986–1994, 1998); Minister of Defence (1981–1982); Member of the Senate (1983–1986); Minister of Foreign Affairs (1994–1998); Deputy Prime Minister (1994–1998)
Edzo Toxopeus	Edzo Toxopeus (1918–2009)	22 January 1985	VVD	Member of the House of Representatives (1956–1959, 1963, 1965–1969); Minister of the Interior (1959–1965); Queen's Commissioner of Groningen (1970–1980); Member of the Council of State (1980–1988)
Frits Korthals Altes	Frits Korthals Altes (1931–2025)	26 October 2001	VVD	Member of the Senate (1981–1982, 1991–2001); Minister of Justice (1982–1989); Minister of the Interior (1986, 1987); Member of the House of Representatives (1989–1991); President of the Senate (1997–2001)
Willem Scholten	Willem Scholten (1927–2005)	1 July 1997	CDA	Member of the House of Representatives (1963–1971, 1972–1976); State Secretary for Finance (1971–1973); Member of the European Parliament (1973–1976); Member of the Council of State (1976–1978); Minister of Defence (1978–1980); Vice-President of the Council of State (1980–1997)
Jelle Zijlstra	Dr. Jelle Zijlstra (1918–2001)	30 April 1983	CDA	Minister of Economic Affairs (1952–1959); Member of the House of Representatives (1956, 1959); Minister of Finance (1958–1963, 1966–1967); Member of the Senate (1963–1966); Prime Minister (1966–1967); Member of the Social and Economic Council (1967–1982); President of the Central Bank (1967–1982)
Emiel van Lennep	Jonkheer; Emiel van Lennep (1915–1996)	29 April 1986	CDA	Treasurer-General (1951–1969); Member of the Social and Economic Council (1984–1986)
Ivo Samkalden	Dr. Ivo Samkalden (1912–1995)	22 January 1985	PvdA	Minister of Justice (1956–1958, 1965–1966); Member of the House of Representatives (1959–1960); Member of the Senate (1960–1965); Mayor of Amsterdam (1967–1977); Chairman of the Association of Municipalities (1971–1977)
Marinus Ruppert	Marinus Ruppert (1911–1992)	29 November 1980	CDA	Member of the Social and Economic Council (1950–1959); Member of the Senate (1956–1959); Member of the Council of State (1959–1973); Vice-President of the Council of State (1973–1980)
Willem Drees	Willem Drees (1886–1988)	22 December 1958	PvdA	Member of the House of Representatives (1933–1945, 1946, 1948, 1952, 1956); Minister of Social Affairs (1945–1948); Deputy Prime Minister (1945–1948); Prime Minister (1948–1958)
Marga Klompé	Dr. Marga Klompé (1912–1986)	17 July 1971	KVP	Member of the House of Representatives (1948–1956, 1959, 1963–1966, 1967); Member of the Common Assembly of the ECSC (1952–1956); Minister of Social Work (1956–1963); Minister of Education, Arts and Sciences (1961–1962, 1963); Minister of Culture, Recreation and Social Work (1966–1971)
Jaap Burger	Jaap Burger (1904–1986)	4 January 1975	PvdA	Minister for Government Restoration (1943–1944); Minister of the Interior (1944–1945); Member of the House of Representatives (1945–1962); Member of the Senate (1963–1970); Member of the European Parliament (1966–1970); Member of the Council of State (1970–1979)
Eelco van Kleffens	Dr. Eelco van Kleffens (1894–1983)	4 July 1950	Indep.	Minister of Foreign Affairs (1939–1946); Minister for Foreign Policy (1946–1947); Ambassador to the United States (1947–1949); Ambassador to the United Nations (1947–1949, 1954–1955); Ambassador to Portugal (1950–1956); Permanent Representative to NATO and the OECD (1956–1958); Permanent Representative to the ECSC (1958–1967)
Jan Donner	Dr. Jan Donner (1891–1981)	16 December 1971	ARP	Minister of Justice (1926–1933); Judge of the Supreme Court (1933–1944, 1945–1947); President of the Supreme Court (1947–1961)
Carl Romme	Carl Romme (1896–1980)	16 December 1971	KVP	Member of the House of Representatives (1933, 1946–1961); Member of the Senate (1937); Minister of Social Affairs (1937–1939); Member of the Council of State (1962–1972)
Alidius Tjarda van Starkenborgh Stachouwer	Dr. Jonkheer; Alidius Tjarda van Starkenborgh Stachouwer (1888–1978)	28 June 1956	Indep.	Queen's Commissioner of Groningen (1925–1933); Governor-General of the Dutch East Indies (1937–1945); Ambassador to Belgium (1933–1937); Ambassador to France (1950–1956); Permanent Representative to the OECD (1950–1956)
Louis Beel	Dr. Louis Beel (1902–1977)	21 November 1956	KVP	Minister of the Interior (1945–1947, 1951–1956); Member of the House of Representatives (1946, 1948); Prime Minister (1946–1948, 1958–1959); Governor-General of the Dutch East Indies (1948–1949); Deputy Prime Minister (1952–1956); Minister of Social Affairs and Health (1958–1959); Member of the Council of State (1958, 1959); Vice-President of the Council of State (1959–1972)
Jo Cals	Jo Cals (1914–1971)	5 December 1966	KVP	Member of the House of Representatives (1948–1950, 1952, 1956, 1959, 1963–1965); State Secretary for Education, Arts and Sciences (1950–1952); Minister of Education, Arts and Sciences (1952–1961, 1962–1963); Prime Minister (1965–1966)
Pieter Oud	Pieter Oud (1886–1968)	9 November 1963	VVD	Member of the House of Representatives (1917–1933, 1937–1938, 1948–1963); Minister of Finance (1933–1937); Mayor of Rotterdam (1938–1941, 1945–1952); Chairman of the Association of Municipalities (1946–1952)
Josef van Schaik	Josef van Schaik (1882–1962)	15 March 1951	KVP	Member of the House of Representatives (1917–1933, 1937–1948); Speaker of the House of Representatives (1929–1933, 1937–1948); Minister of Justice (1933–1937); Deputy Prime Minister (1948–1951); Minister for Constitutional Reform (1948–1951); Member of the Council of State (1951–1957)
Pieter Sjoerds Gerbrandy	Dr. Pieter Sjoerds Gerbrandy (1885–1961)	5 April 1955	ARP	Minister of Justice (1939–1942, 1945); Chairman of the Council of Ministers (1940–1945); Minister of Colonial Affairs (1941–1942); Member of the House of Representatives (1948–1956, 1956–1959)
Frans Beelaerts van Blokland	Jonkheer; Frans Beelaerts van Blokland (1872–1956)	22 December 1936	CHU	Minister of Foreign Affairs (1927–1933); Ambassador to China (1923–1927); Vice-President of the Council of State (1933–1956); Chairman of the Council of Nobility (1947–1956)
Piet Aalberse	Piet Aalberse (1871–1948)	31 December 1934	RKSP	Member of the House of Representatives (1903–1916, 1925–1937); Minister of Labour (1918–1923); Minister of Labour, Commerce and Industry (1923–1925); Speaker of the House of Representatives (1936–1937); Member of the Council of State (1937–1946)
Dirk Jan de Geer	Jonkheer; Dirk Jan de Geer (1870–1960)	31 August 1933 – 12 November 1947 (Note: Dirk Jan de Geer′s title of Minister of State was removed by a post-war court on 12 November 1947 after he was tried and found guilty of treason and betrayal for his actions during the German occupation of the Netherlands in World War II.)	CHU	Member of the House of Representatives (1907–1921, 1922, 1933–1939); Mayor of Arnhem (1920–1921); Minister of Finance (1921–1923, 1923–1933, 1939–1940); Minister of the Interior and Agriculture (1925–1926); Chairman of the Council of Ministers (1923–1933, 1939–1940)
Willem Lodewijk de Vos van Steenwijk	Baron; Willem Lodewijk de Vos van Steenwijk (1859–1947)	11 July 1946	CHU	Member of the Senate (1913–1946); President of the Senate (1929–1946)
Hendrikus Colijn	Hendrikus Colijn (1869–1944)	31 August 1929	ARP	Member of the House of Representatives (1909–1911, 1922–1923, 1929–1933, 1937); Minister of War (1911–1913); Minister of the Navy (1912–1913); Member of the Senate (1914–1920, 1926–1929, 1939–1944); Minister of Finance (1923–1926, 1939); Minister of Colonial Affairs (1925, 1933–1937); Chairman of the Council of Ministers (1925–1926, 1933–1939); Minister of Economic Affairs (1934, 1939); Minister of Defence (1935–1937)
Jean Jacques Rambonnet	Vice Admiral; Jean Jacques Rambonnet (1864–1943)	13 January 1920	Indep.	Minister of the Navy (1913–1918)
Herman van Karnebeek	Dr. Jonkheer; Herman Adriaan van Karnebeek (1874–1942)	25 July 1927	Indep.	Mayor of The Hague (1911–1918); Minister of Foreign Affairs (1918–1927); Ambassador to the League of Nations (1927–1928); Queen's Commissioner of South Holland (1928–1942)
Dirk Fock	Dr. Dirk Fock (1858–1941)	24 August 1928	LSP	Member of the House of Representatives (1901–1905, 1913–1920); Minister of Colonial Affairs (1905–1908); Governor-General of Suriname (1908–1911); Speaker of the House of Representatives (1917–1920); Governor-General of the Dutch East Indies (1921–1926); Member of the Senate (1929–1935)
Pieter Cort van der Linden	Dr. Pieter Cort van der Linden (1846–1935)	28 January 1915	Indep.	Minister of Justice (1897–1901); Member of the Council of State (1902–1913, 1918–1935); Minister of the Interior (1913–1918); Chairman of the Council of Ministers (1913–1918)
Johannes Theodoor de Visser	Dr. Johannes Theodoor de Visser (1857–1932)	31 August 1931	CHU	Member of the House of Representatives (1897–1905, 1906–1913, 1914–1918, 1922, 1925–1929); Minister of Education, Arts and Sciences (1918–1925)
