= Elisabeth Post =

Dutch politician

Queen's Commissioner of North Holland
- Acting
- In office 1 December 2009 – 1 July 2010
- Monarch: Beatrix
- Preceded by: Harry Borghouts
- Succeeded by: Johan Remkes

Personal details
- Born: Elisabeth Post; 27 July 1965 (age 60) Hilversum, Netherlands
- Party: People's Party for Freedom and Democracy
- Occupation: Politician; Civil servant

Elisabeth Post (born 27 July 1965) is a Dutch politician who served as a member of the Provincial-Executive of North Holland from 2009 to 2019. She is a member of the People's Party for Freedom and Democracy (VVD).

== Career ==
Elected to the municipal council of Hilversum from 1994 to 2006 for the People's Party for Freedom and Democracy, Post chaired the party's group during her last four years in office. In the 2007 provincial election, she was elected to the Provincial Council of North Holland. Two years later, she became a member of the Provincial-Executive. She also served as Acting Queen's Commissioner of North Holland after the resignation of Harry Borghouts.

She was lijstrekker for the VVD in the 2011 provincial election. In 2019, she stepped down from the Provincial-Executive to become chairwoman of the Transport en Logistiek Nederland (TLN) business organisation, which was previously chaired by newly-installed King's Commissioner of North Holland Arthur van Dijk.

Political offices
Preceded by Harry Borghouts	Acting Queen's Commissioner of North Holland; 2009–2010	Succeeded by Johan Remkes
