= Pauline Krikke =

Dutch politician

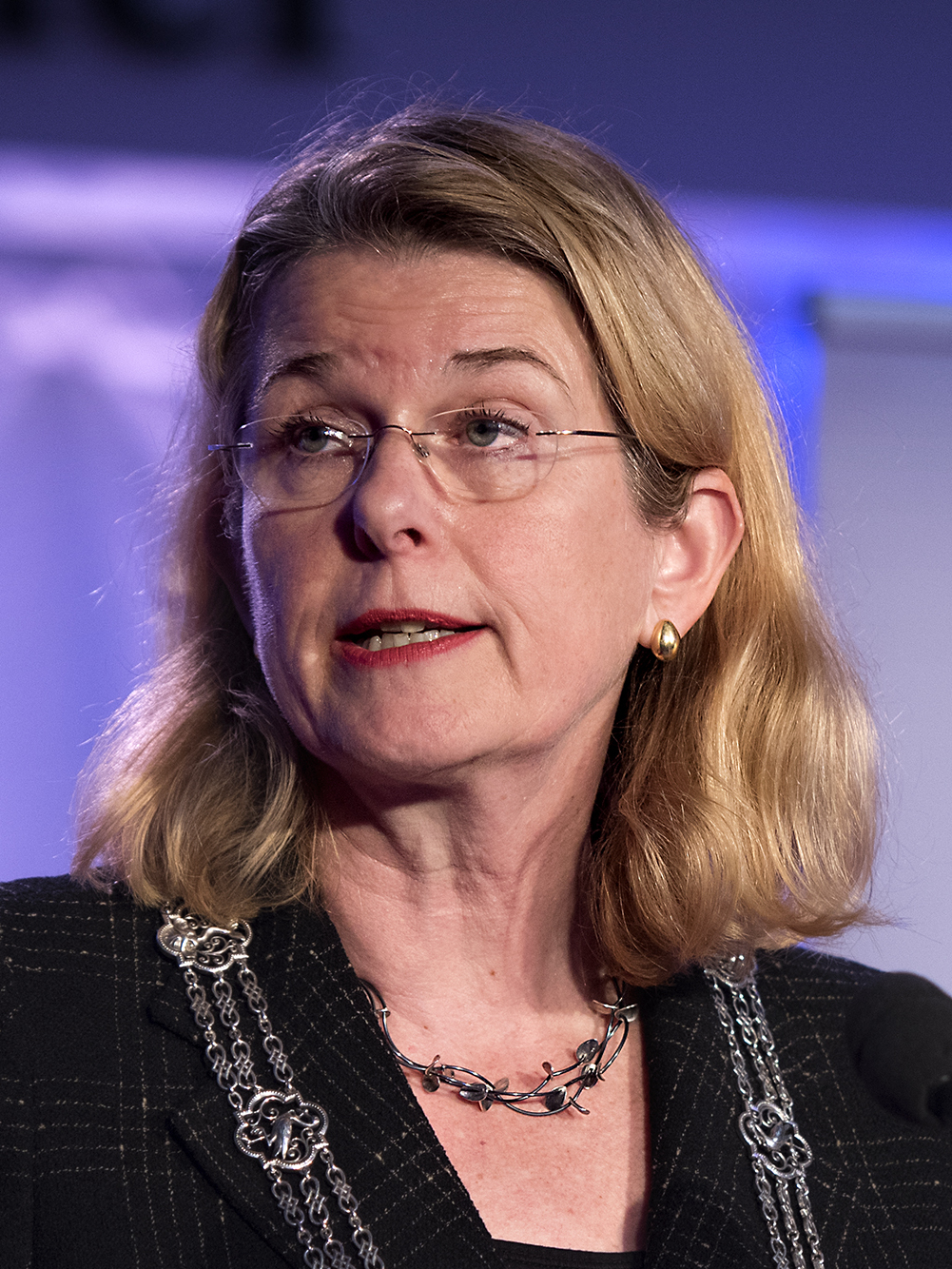
- Krikke in 2018

Mayor of The Hague
- In office 17 March 2017 – 6 October 2019
- Preceded by: Jozias van Aartsen
- Succeeded by: Boudewijn Revis (Ad Interim); Johan Remkes (Acting); Jan van Zanen

Mayor of Arnhem
- In office 3 September 2001 – 1 July 2013
- Preceded by: Paul Scholten
- Succeeded by: Herman Kaiser

Personal details
- Born: Pauline Christine Krikke; 9 May 1961 (age 64) Sneek, Netherlands
- Party: People’s Party for Freedom and Democracy

Pauline Christine Krikke (born 9 May 1961) is a Dutch politician who served as mayor of The Hague from 2017 until 2019. A member of the People's Party for Freedom and Democracy (VVD), she previously served as mayor of Arnhem from 2001 to 2013. She started her career as a councillor (1994–1996) and alderwoman in Amsterdam (1996–2001) and was elected to the Senate between 2015 and 2017.

== Early life and education ==
Pauline Krikke was born in Sneek in 1961. After graduating from the Frederik Muller Academy, Krikke studied law for some years at the Vrije Universiteit in Amsterdam. At the time she became increasingly involved in both international relations and public administration. She served on the National Board of the Student Association for International Relations (SIB) and the Executive Committee of the International Youth and Student Movement for the United Nations (ISMUN).

== Career ==
After leading the campaign for the VVD in Amsterdam in 1986, she started her own service company for campaigns, congresses and events, meanwhile serving on the boards of Housing Corporation Nieuw Amsterdam, Employers association for Childcarecentres, and the Governments Council of Youth Policy.

=== Local politics (1994–2013) ===
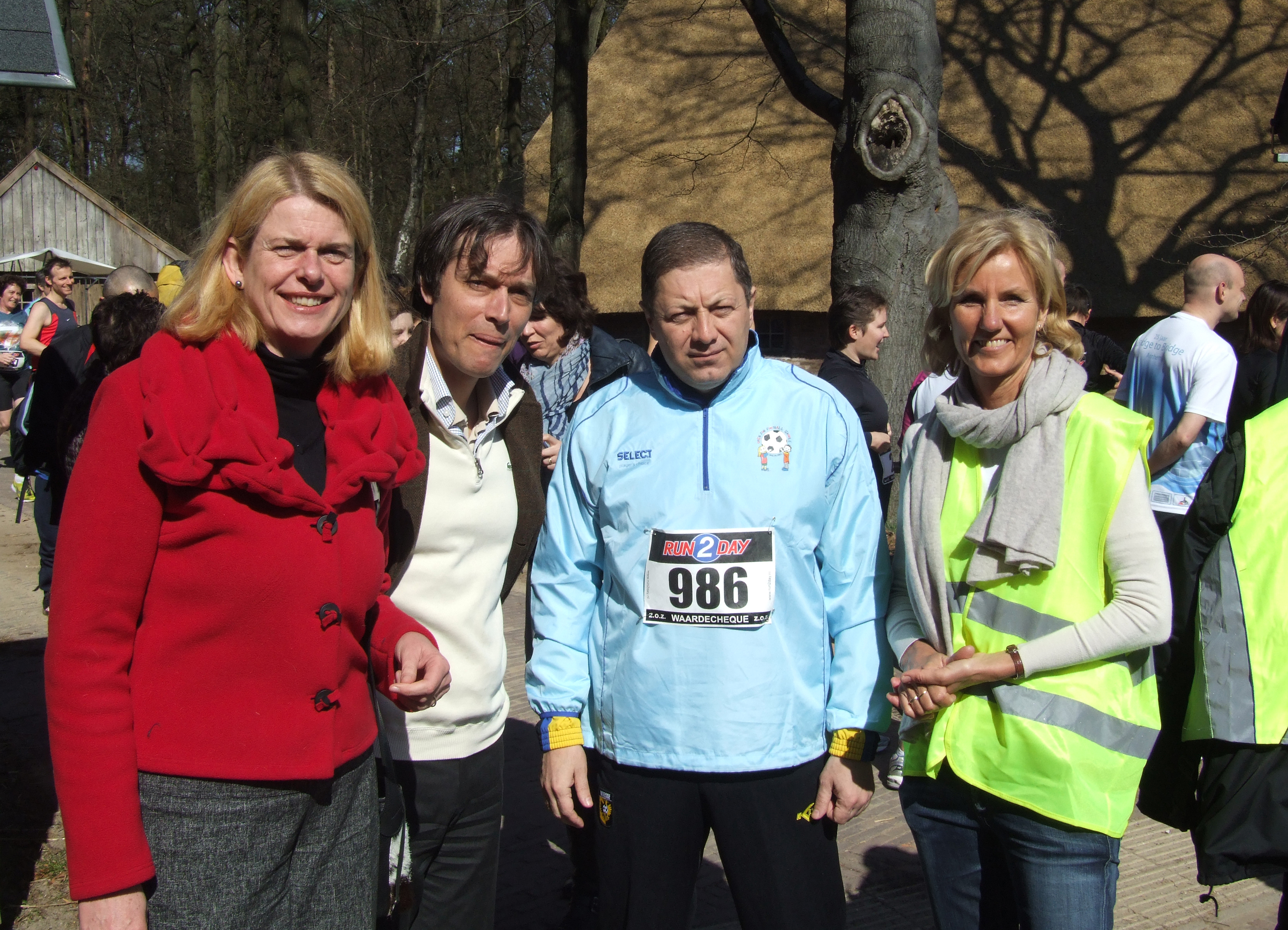
Pauline Krikke (left) as Mayor of Arnhem, 2011

In 1994, Krikke was elected for the Amsterdam's City Council, and two years later, she was appointed in the college van burgemeester en wethouders for economic affairs, airports and seaports. After the elections of 1998, she was assigned the portfolios 'economic affairs and employment' and 'urban planning, housing and economy of the inner city'. She has also fulfilled several functions as a council member and commissioner, and was delegation leader of international missions with representatives of companies and institutions from Amsterdam

In 2001 she was appointed by The Crown to be the Mayor of Arnhem, and in 2007 for another term of six years.

Meanwhile, she held governmental subsidiary positions such as Taskforce Youth Unemployment, and Consultative Commission On Disaster Relief. Within her own political party she was Chairperson of the Permanent Committee for scouting Representatives for the National and European Parliaments (2004–2012).

On 29 October 2012, Krikke announced she would not seek a third term as mayor of Arnhem, creating ample time for both the municipality and herself, for "flow, and recalibration of perspectives" before the summer of 2013. On her departure she was invested as a Knight of the Order of Orange-Nassau.

=== Member of the Senate (2015–17) ===
Between 2015 and 2017, Krikke served as member of the Senate.

In addition to her parliamentary assignments, Krikke also served as member of the Dutch delegation to the Parliamentary Assembly of the Council of Europe since 2016. As member of the Alliance of Liberals and Democrats for Europe group, she is currently a member of the Committee on Culture, Science, Education and Media. She was part of a cross-party delegation to observe the 2016 parliamentary elections in Macedonia.

=== Mayor of the Hague (2017–2019) ===
In March 2017 she became mayor of The Hague. Almost all local parties supported her appointment. In October 2019 she resigned, following the conclusions of a report that blamed her office with the 2018 New Year's Eve and 2019 New Year's Day fires in Scheveningen, The Hague.

== Other activities ==
Krikke has been a Fellow of the German Marshall Fund of the United States since 1992 and as such participated in the Migration Dialogue 1998–2000. The Eindhoven University of Technology selected Krikke for its supervisory board (2003–2011).

Krikke will remain on the board of the Netherlands Red Cross and a member of the Dutch Delegation in the Governing Board of the International Federation of Red Cross and Red Crescent Societies (IFRC).

Other positions of Krikke include Chairperson of the Netherlands Vehicle Authority (RDW), Chairperson of the Nationwide Consultation consumer interests Public Transport, Chairperson of the Strategic Advisory Board of the Dutch Association of Insurers, and a member of Association Aegon.

| Preceded by Paul Scholten | Mayor of Arnhem; 2001–2013 | Succeeded by Herman Kaiser |
| Preceded by Tom de Bruijn (Acting) | Mayor of The Hague; 2017–present | Succeeded by Incumbent |
