= List of King's and Queen's commissioners of North Holland =

This article is a list of King's and Queen's commissioners of the province of North Holland, Netherlands.

== Governors of North Holland (1814–1850) ==
Portrait	Name (birth–death)	Term of office	Party	Monarch
	Arnold van Tets van Goudriaan (1771–1837)	1 May 1814 – 7 May 1828 (Resigned)	Independent; Conservative (Liberal Conservative)	William I (1815–1840)
	Baron; Jan van Tuyll van Serooskerken van Vleuten (1771–1843)	23 August 1828 – 28 December 1839	Independent (Liberal)	William I (1815–1840)
Daniël van Ewijck van Oostbroek en de Bilt	Dr. Daniël van Ewijck van Oostbroek en de Bilt (1786–1858)	1 January 1840 – 1 August 1850	Independent (Liberal)	William II (1840–1849)

== King's and Queen's commissioners of North Holland (since 1850) ==
Portrait	Name (birth–death)	Term of office	Party	Monarch
Daniël van Ewijck van Oostbroek en de Bilt	Dr. Daniël van Ewijck van Oostbroek en de Bilt (1786–1858)	1 August 1850 – 1 October 1855	Independent (Liberal)	William III (1849–1890)
	Jonkheer; Willem Boreel van Hogelanden (1800–1883)	1 October 1855 – 1 May 1860	Independent (Conservative Liberal)	William III (1849–1890)
	Baron; Herman Röell (1806–1883)	1 May 1860 – 1 October 1879	Independent (Liberal)	William III (1849–1890)
Johan Schorer	Jonkheer; Johan Schorer (1834–1903)	15 December 1879 – 1 February 1897	Independent (Conservative Liberal)	William III (1849–1890)
Johan Schorer	Jonkheer; Johan Schorer (1834–1903)	15 December 1879 – 1 February 1897	Independent (Conservative Liberal)	Wilhelmina (1890–1948)
Gijsbert van Tienhoven	Gijsbert van Tienhoven (1841–1914)	1 February 1897 – 1 August 1911	Independent (Liberal)	Wilhelmina (1890–1948)
Wilhelm van Leeuwen	Dr. Wilhelm van Leeuwen (1860–1930)	16 September 1911 – 16 December 1914	Independent (Liberal)	Wilhelmina (1890–1948)
Antonie Röell	Dr. Baron; Antonie Röell (1864–1940)	16 January 1915 – 29 November 1940 (Died)	Independent (Liberal)	Wilhelmina (1890–1948)
	Albert Backer (1899–1976)	10 February 1941 – 5 May 1945 (Dismissed)	National Socialist; Movement	Wilhelmina (1890–1948)
Jaap de Vos van Steenwijk	Dr. Baron; Jaap de Vos van Steenwijk (1889–1978)	7 May 1945 – 15 June 1954 (9 years, 39 days)	Liberal State Party (1945–1946)	Wilhelmina (1890–1948)
Jaap de Vos van Steenwijk	Dr. Baron; Jaap de Vos van Steenwijk (1889–1978)	7 May 1945 – 15 June 1954 (9 years, 39 days)	Freedom Party (1946–1948)	Wilhelmina (1890–1948)
Jaap de Vos van Steenwijk	Dr. Baron; Jaap de Vos van Steenwijk (1889–1978)	7 May 1945 – 15 June 1954 (9 years, 39 days)	People's Party for Freedom and Democracy (1948–1954)	Juliana (1948–1980)
Max Prinsen	Dr. Max Prinsen (1899–1971)	1 July 1954 – 1 February 1964 (9 years, 215 days)	Labour Party	Juliana (1948–1980)
Ferdinand Kranenburg	Ferdinand; Kranenburg (1911–1994)	1 February 1964 – 1 May 1976 (12 years, 90 days)	Labour Party	Juliana (1948–1980)
	Willem van der Knoop (1919–2007)	1 May 1976 – 16 August 1976 (107 days) (Ad Interim)	Labour Party	Juliana (1948–1980)
Roel de Wit	Roel de Wit (1927–2012)	16 August 1976 – 1 April 1992 (15 years, 229 days)	Labour Party	Juliana (1948–1980)
Roel de Wit	Roel de Wit (1927–2012)	16 August 1976 – 1 April 1992 (15 years, 229 days)	Labour Party	Beatrix (1980–2013)
	Wim van Gelder (1942)	1 April 1992 – 1 May 1992 (30 days) (Ad Interim)	Christian; Democratic Appeal	Beatrix (1980–2013)
Jos van Kemenade	Dr. Jos van Kemenade (1937–2020)	1 May 1992 – 1 April 2002 (9 years, 335 days)	Labour Party	Beatrix (1980–2013)
	Aranka Goijert (1941)	1 April 2002 – 1 June 2002 (61 days) (Ad Interim)	Christian; Democratic Appeal	Beatrix (1980–2013)
	Harry Borghouts (born 1943)	1 June 2002 – 1 December 2009 (7 years, 183 days) (Resigned)	GroenLinks	Beatrix (1980–2013)
	Elisabeth Post (born 1965)	1 December 2009 – 1 July 2010 (212 days) (Ad Interim)	People's Party for Freedom and Democracy	Beatrix (1980–2013)
Johan Remkes	Johan Remkes (born 1951)	1 July 2010 – 1 January 2019 (8 years, 184 days)	People's Party for Freedom and Democracy	Beatrix (1980–2013)
Johan Remkes	Johan Remkes (born 1951)	1 July 2010 – 1 January 2019 (8 years, 184 days)	People's Party for Freedom and Democracy	Willem-Alexander (1913–present)
	Arthur van Dijk (born 1963)	1 January 2019 – Incumbent (6 years, 186 days)	People's Party for Freedom and Democracy	Willem-Alexander (1913–present)
