= Anne Mulder =

Dutch politician (born 1969)

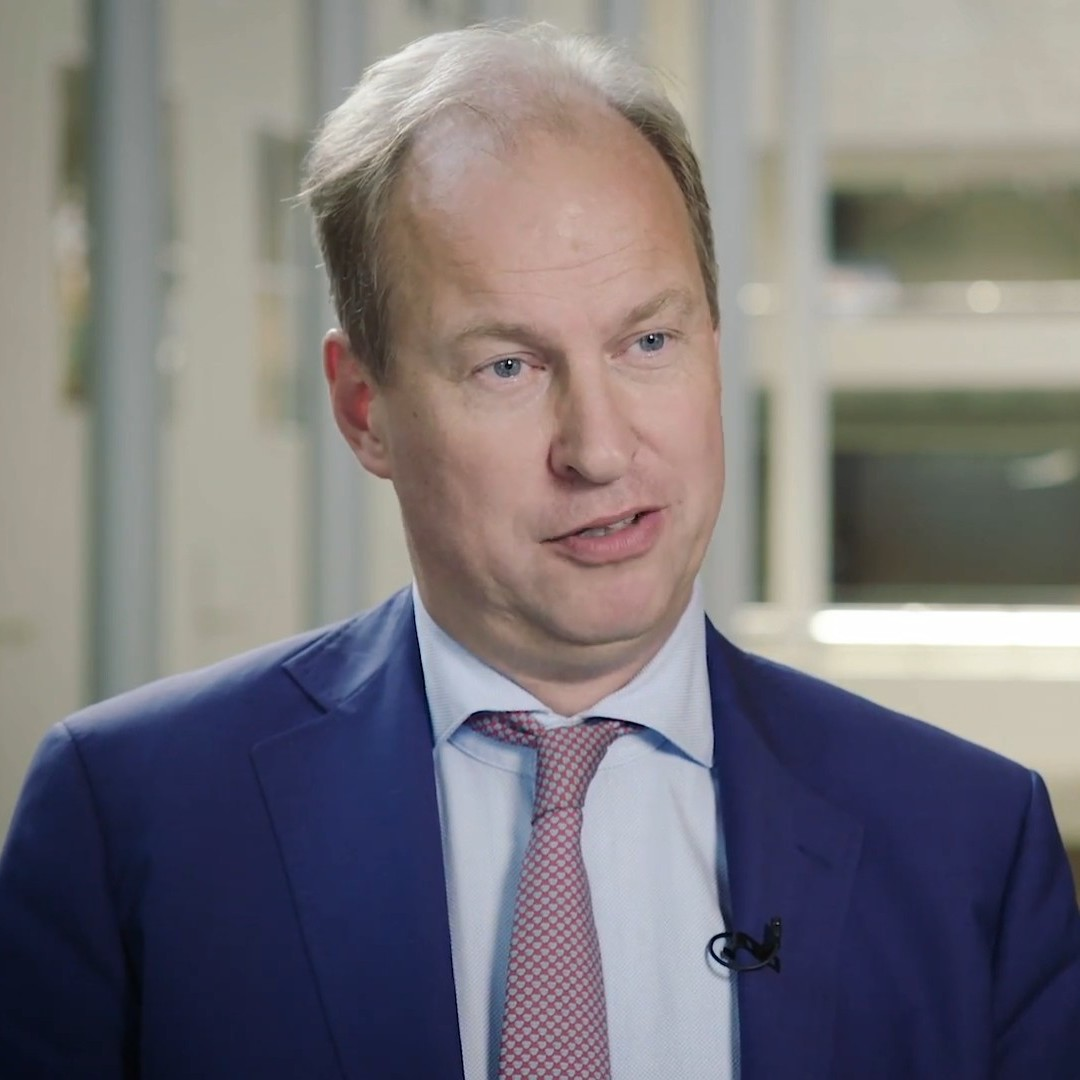

Mayor of Halderberge
- Acting
- Assumed office 10 March 2025
- Preceded by: Bernd Roks

Member of the House of Representatives
- In office 17 June 2010 – 18 September 2020

Personal details
- Born: 14 December 1969 (age 56) Hoogeveen, Netherlands
- Party: People's Party for Freedom and Democracy
- Education: Erasmus University Rotterdam
- Occupation: Civil servant, consultant, politician

Anne Mulder (born 14 December 1969) is a Dutch politician and former civil servant who has served as Acting Mayor of Halderberge since 2025. A member of the People's Party for Freedom and Democracy (VVD), he previously served in the House of Representatives from 2010 to 2020, where he focused on matters of health care insurance, prevention and pharmaceutics, as well as an alderman in the municipal executive of The Hague from 2020 to 2023, tasked with finance and city development.

== Education and early career ==
A native of Hoogeveen, Mulder studied political economy at Erasmus University Rotterdam. As a conscripted soldier he served with the UNPROFOR in Dutchbat III in Bosnia and Herzegovina. Mulder worked as an inspector at the Ministry of Finance from 1996 to 2000, as a collaborator to the VVD's parliamentary group in the House of Representatives from 2000 to 2004 and as a policy advisor to the Ministry of the Interior and Kingdom Relations from 2004 to 2005. Between 2005 and 2015, he also worked as consultant with public affairs firm Pauw Sanders Zeilstra Van Spaendonck (PSZVS) in The Hague.

== Political career ==
Mulder held a seat in the municipal council of The Hague from 2002 to 2010, where he chaired the party group from 2006 until 2010.

In Parliament, Mulder served on the Defence Committee; the Committee on European Affairs; the Finance Committee; the Committee on Foreign Affairs; the Committee on Foreign Trade and Development Cooperation; the Committee on Infrastructure and the Environment; and the Committee on Security and Justice. In this capacity, he was the Parliament's co-rapporteur on Brexit from 2019 alongside Pieter Omtzigt and Kees Verhoeven.

In addition to his role in Parliament, Mulder served as a member of the Dutch delegation to the Parliamentary Assembly of the Council of Europe from 2016. As a member of the Alliance of Liberals and Democrats for Europe, he was a member of the Committee on Political Affairs and Democracy and a member of the Committee on the Honouring of Obligations and Commitments by Member States of the Council of Europe (Monitoring Committee). In this capacity, he served as one of the Assembly's co-rapporteurs (alongside Emanuelis Zingeris) on Montenegro. Mulder was a member of a cross-party delegation to observe the 2016 presidential elections in Bulgaria and the 2017 presidential elections in Serbia.

In 2020, Mulder resigned his seat in the House of Representatives two days after he was appointed alderman for finance and city development in The Hague. He succeeded Boudewijn Revis. In 2021, Mulder was chosen as the VVD lead candidate (lijsttrekker) for the 2022 municipal election in The Hague. On 29 June 2023, he immediately submitted his resignation as alderman of The Hague.

== Electoral history ==
A (possibly incomplete) overview of Dutch elections Mulder participated in
| Election | Party | Candidate number | Votes |
|---|---|---|---|
| 2010 Dutch general election | People's Party for Freedom and Democracy | | 1,467 |
| 2012 Dutch general election | People's Party for Freedom and Democracy | | 1,204 |
| 2017 Dutch general election | People's Party for Freedom and Democracy | 17 | 1,293 |
| 2022 Dutch municipal elections in The Hague | People's Party for Freedom and Democracy | 1 | 11,874 |

== Decorations ==
Honours
| Ribbon bar | Honour | Country | Date | Comment |
| | Knight of the Order of Orange-Nassau | Netherlands | 24 September 2020 | |
