= Harry Borghouts =

Dutch politician (born 1943)

Queen's Commissioner in North Holland
- In office 1 June 2002 – 1 December 2009
- Monarch: Queen Beatrix
- Preceded by: Jos van Kemenade
- Succeeded by: Elisabeth Post

Personal details
- Born: 7 February 1943 (age 83) Bergen op Zoom, Netherlands
- Party: Political Party of Radicals; GreenLeft
- Education: Royal Netherlands Naval College; University of Amsterdam

Henricus Cornelius Johannes Lodewijk (Harry) Borghouts (born 7 February 1943) was the Queen's Commissioner in the province North Holland from 2002 till 2009. He is a member of the political party GreenLeft. He was the Secretary-General of the Ministry of Justice in the Netherlands from 1996 to 2002.

Harry Borghouts was born in Bergen op Zoom in the Netherlands. His father, who fought for the Dutch resistance during World War II, was State Secretary of Defence from 1965 to 1966. After his gymnasium education in Rotterdam, where he majored in arts, Borghouts studied to be a naval officer at the Royal Netherlands Naval College from 1961 to 1964. Afterwards, he studied Law at the University of Amsterdam, where he graduated in 1977.

Borghouts was made Officer in the Order of Orange-Nassau on 28 April 2006.

Political offices
Preceded by Jos van Kemenade	Queen's Commissioner in North Holland; 1 June 2002 – December 2009	Succeeded by Elisabeth Post (a.i.) / Johan Remkes
