= Herman Adriaan van Karnebeek =

Dutch politician (1874–1942)

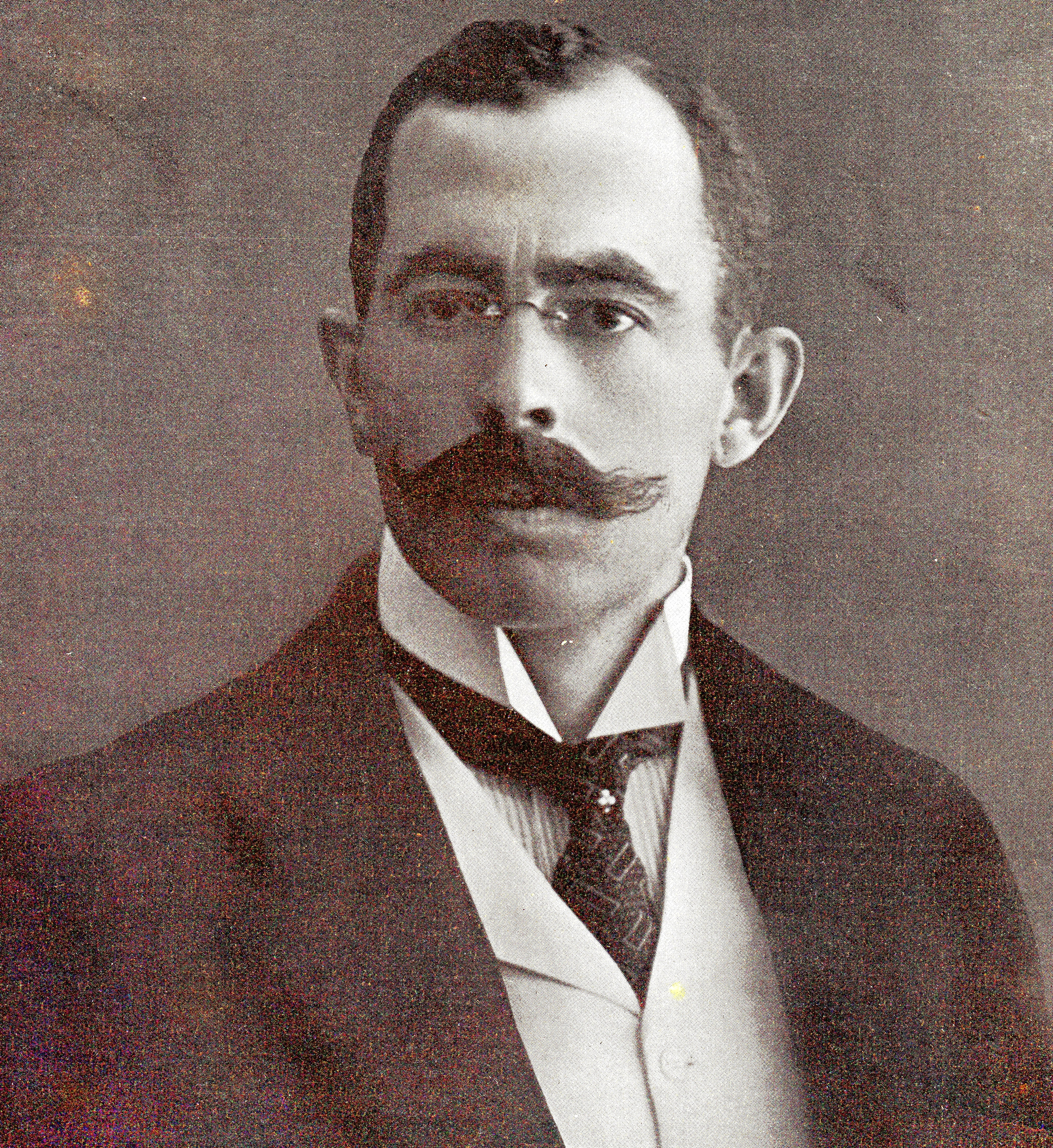
Van Karnebeek in 1911

Jonkheer Herman Adriaan van Karnebeek (21 August 1874 – 29 March 1942) was a Dutch politician and diplomat who served as Minister of Foreign Affairs from 1918 until his resignation in 1927. In that capacity, he was President of the Assembly of the League of Nations in 1921 and 1922.

== Biography ==
A native of The Hague, his father was Abraham van Karnebeek (1836–1925), a conservative-liberal politician who also served as Minister of Foreign Affairs, from 1885 to 1888.

Herman Adriaan van Karnebeek studied law at the University of Utrecht. A conservative liberal like his father, he served as mayor of The Hague (1911–1918) before becoming Minister of Foreign Affairs on 9 September 1918 in the first cabinet of Charles Ruijs de Beerenbrouck. A staunch pro-German, he continued to serve as Foreign Minister in the first cabinet of Dr. Hendrik Colijn. He eventually resigned when his concept treaty with Belgium was rejected by a parliamentary majority on 1 April 1927, but was appointed to the honorific title of Minister of State. In 1928, he became Queen's commissioner in South Holland, a position he held until his death in 1942. From 1936 until his death, he also served as chairman of the Carnegie Foundation.

He died on 29 March 1942, aged 67, in The Hague.

== Private life ==
Van Karnebeek was married to Baroness Adriana J.C. van Wassenaar van Rosande. One of his four sons, jonkheer (jhr.) Maurits Pieter Marie van Karnebeek (1908–1985), was mayor of Zwolle from 1940 to 1944.

In 1923 he bought the estate De Eese on the provincial border between Overijssel, Drenthe and Friesland. As of 2013, the estate is still the property of the Van Karnebeek family. From 1889 onwards, he was a cricket player for The Hague Cricket Club (HCC).

== Honours ==
- 1922: Grand Cross,
- 1925: Grand Cordon, Order of Leopold.
- Order of Saint Sava, I degree.

== Notes ==
Political offices
Preceded by Emile Claude, Baron Sweerts de Landas Wyborgh	Mayor of The Hague; 1911–1918	Succeeded by Jacob Adriaan Nicolaas Patijn
Preceded by John Loudon	Minister of Foreign Affairs; 1918–1927	Succeeded by Frans Beelaerts van Blokland
Preceded by Emile Claude, Baron Sweerts de Landas Wyborgh	Queen's commissioner in South Holland; 1928–1942	Succeeded by Robert van Genechten
Diplomatic posts
Preceded by Paul Hymans	Presidents of the Assembly of the League of Nations; 1921–1922	Succeeded by Agustín Edwards Mac-Clure
