= Boudewijn Revis =

Dutch politician (born 1974)

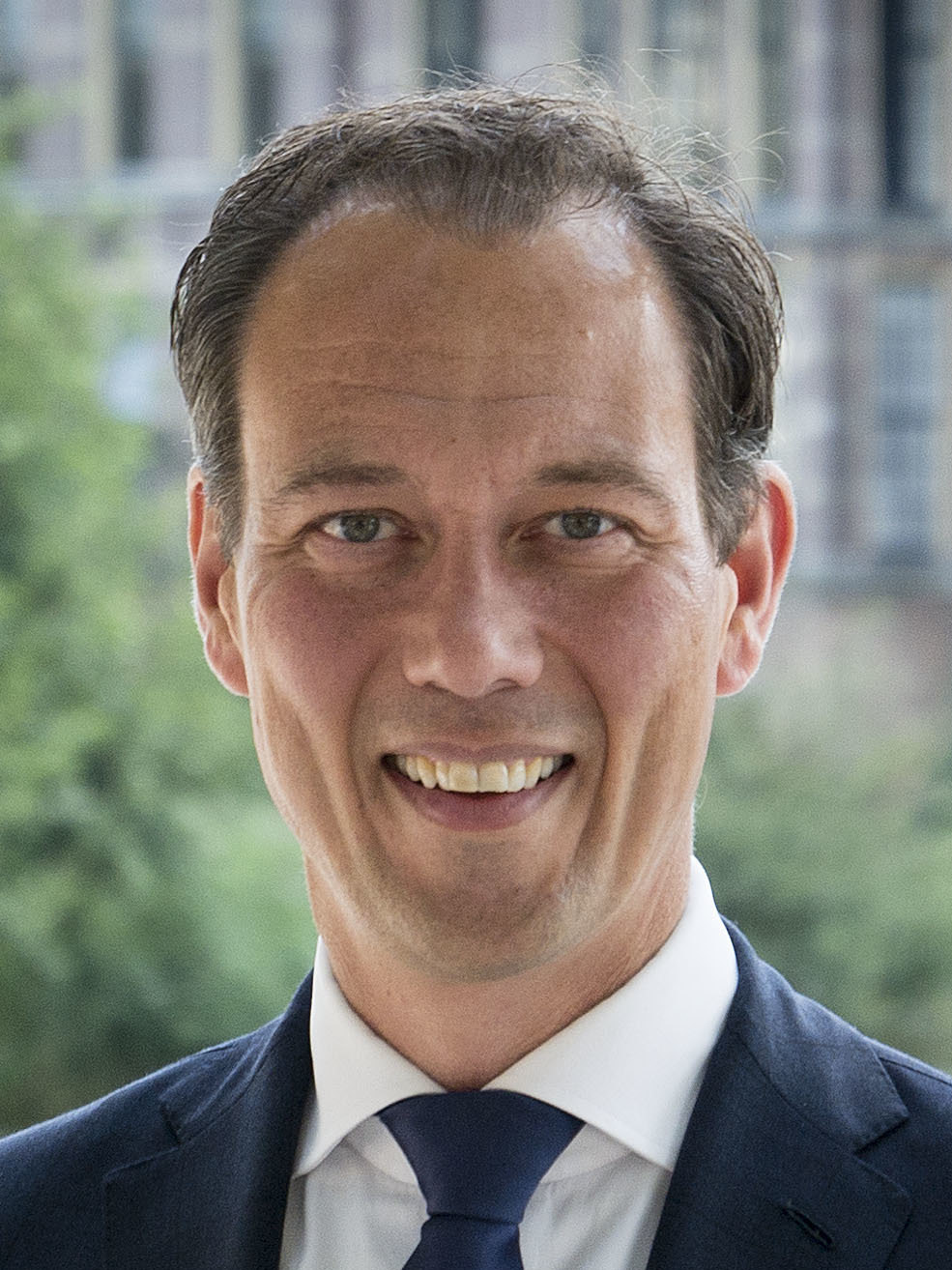

Mayor of The Hague
- Ad interim
- In office 6 October 2019 – 12 October 2019
- Preceded by: Pauline Krikke
- Succeeded by: Johan Remkes (Acting)

Personal details
- Born: 21 July 1974 (age 51) Nijmegen, Netherlands
- Party: People's Party for Freedom and Democracy
- Occupation: Politician

Boudewijn Revis (born 21 July 1974) is a Dutch politician. A member of the People's Party for Freedom and Democracy (VVD), he served as ad interim Mayor of The Hague from the resignation of Pauline Krikke on 6 October 2019 until the formal appointment and swearing-in of Johan Remkes as Acting Mayor of The Hague the following 12 October.

== Career ==
Revis entered the municipal council of The Hague for the People's Party for Freedom and Democracy in 2008 before he assumed the party group's leadership in 2010. In 2012, Revis was elevated to an aldermanship following the appointment of Sander Dekker as a State Secretary at the Ministry of Education, Culture and Science.

In 2019, he assumed the mayorship ad interim as Second Deputy Mayor of The Hague. First Deputy Mayor Richard de Mos, under criminal investigation, stood down. Upon De Mos's subsequent removal through a motion of no confidence, Revis became First Deputy Mayor of The Hague. After he left office in 2020, his portfolio for finance, urban development and the Scheveningen city district was taken over by Anne Mulder, who left the House of Representatives to fill the position. The title of First Deputy Mayor of The Hague went to alderwoman and fellow party member Kavita Parbhudayal.
