= Guusje ter Horst =

Dutch politician and psychologist (born 1952)

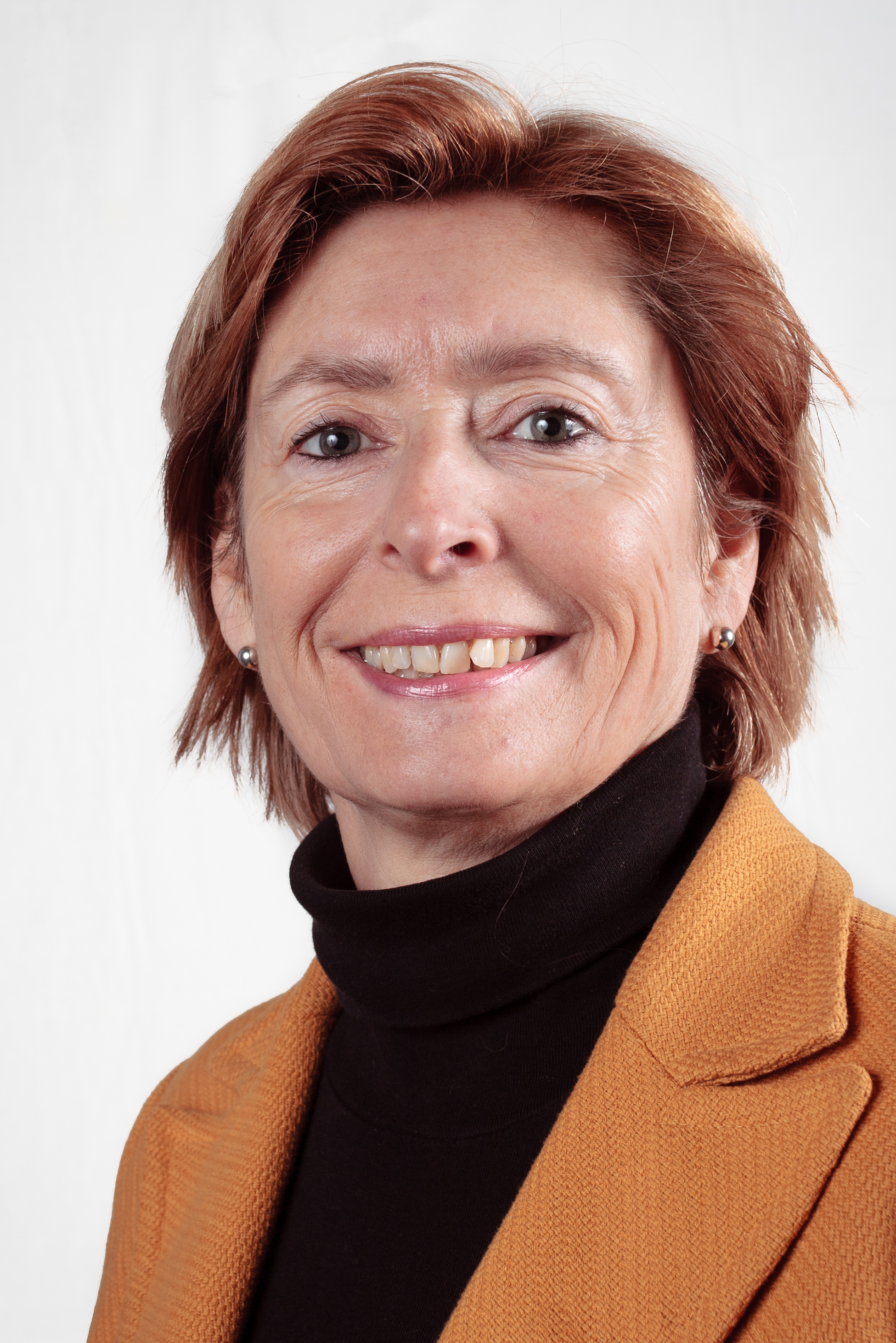
- Ter Horst in 2012

Member of the Senate
- In office 7 June 2011 – 9 June 2015

Minister of the Interior and Kingdom Relations
- In office 22 February 2007 – 23 February 2010
- Prime Minister: Jan Peter Balkenende
- Preceded by: Johan Remkes
- Succeeded by: Ernst Hirsch Ballin

Mayor of Nijmegen
- In office 15 April 2001 – 1 January 2007
- Preceded by: Joop Tettero (ad interim)
- Succeeded by: Thom de Graaf

Personal details
- Born: Guus ter Horst; 22 March 1952 (age 74) Deventer, Netherlands
- Party: Labour Party (from 1984)
- Education: University of Amsterdam (Bachelor of Social Science, Master of Social Science, Doctor of Philosophy)
- Occupation: Politician · civil servant · psychologist · corporate director · nonprofit director · researcher · academic administrator · professor

Guus "Guusje" ter Horst (born 22 March 1952) is a retired Dutch politician of the Labour Party (PvdA) and psychologist. She is a member of the supervisory board of Royal Dutch Shell since 1 January 2013 and chairwoman of the supervisory board of the Institute for Sound and Vision since 11 July 2011.

== Biography ==
Ter Horst attended gymnasium in The Hague and subsequently studied at University of Amsterdam where she obtained a MSc degree in psychology. In 1984 she received a PhD degree in social science on her thesis concerning the question how people who never go to the dentist can be made to do so. Between 1986 and 1994 she was associate professor of Social Dentistry at the subfaculty of Dentistry of the University of Amsterdam.

In 1984 Ter Horst joined the Labour Party (PvdA). In 1986 she was elected to the Amsterdam municipal council. In 1994 she became alderwoman, responsible for spatial planning, she initiated a major renovation of the city of Amsterdam.

In 2001 she became mayor of Nijmegen. During her six-year term, she moved to a new house every year, to get to know the city. In August 2006 Ter Horst was fined for drunk driving, strangely, without political consequence. On 1 January 2007 her term as mayor ended and she did not pursue a second one. She was succeeded by Thom de Graaf.

In 2010 Ter Horst received one of the Dutch Big Brother Awards for her lack of nuance in the privacy debate. Her project of a centrally organised fingerprint database for passports won an award as well. She resigned, together with all PvdA ministers, on the morning of 20 February 2010. The Queen accepted the resignation on 23 February 2010.

Ter Horst became policy driver for the government program Doe onbeperkt mee ("Participate without limits") to empower people with disabilities in December 2022. She stepped down from the position in July 2024, as she was unwilling to serve under incoming State Secretary for Long-term and Social Care Vicky Maeijer of the right-wing populist Party for Freedom (PVV) due to Maeijer's party affiliation.

== Decorations ==
Honours
Ribbon bar	Honour	Country	Date	Comment
	Officer of the Order of Orange-Nassau	Netherlands	3 December 2010	

Political offices
Preceded by Joop Tettero; Ad interim	Mayor of Nijmegen; 2001–2007	Succeeded by Thom de Graaf
Preceded by Johan Remkes	Minister of the Interior and Kingdom Relations; 2007–2010	Succeeded by Ernst Hirsch Ballin
Non-profit organization positions
Preceded by Melanie Schultz van Haegen	Chairwoman of the Supervisory board of the Institute for Sound and Vision; 2011–present	Incumbent
Academic offices
Unknown	President of the Council of the University of Amsterdam; 1992–1994	Unknown
Preceded by Doekle Terpstra	Chairwoman of the Higher Education Schools association 2011–2012	Succeeded by Thom de Graaf
