= Els Borst =

Dutch politician (1932–2014)

Her Excellency Els Borst
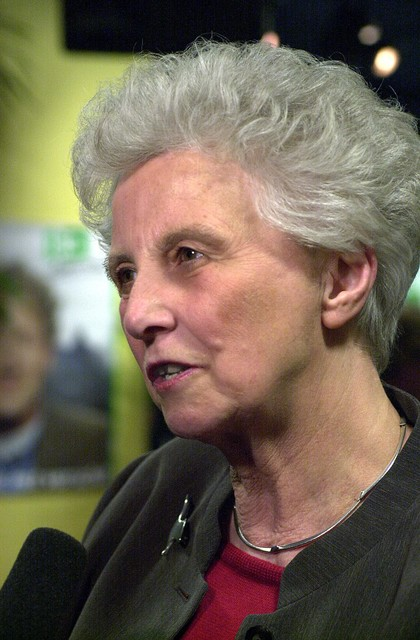
- Borst in 2002

Deputy Prime Minister
- In office 3 August 1998 – 22 July 2002 Serving with Annemarie Jorritsma
- Prime Minister: Wim Kok
- Preceded by: Hans Dijkstal; Hans van Mierlo
- Succeeded by: Eduard Bomhoff; Johan Remkes

Member of the House of Representatives
- In office 19 May 1998 – 3 August 1998
- Parliamentary group: Democrats 66

Parliamentary leader in the House of Representatives
- In office 19 May 1998 – 30 May 1998
- Preceded by: Thom de Graaf
- Succeeded by: Thom de Graaf
- Parliamentary group: Democrats 66

Leader of the Democrats 66
- In office 15 February 1998 – 30 May 1998
- Preceded by: Hans van Mierlo
- Succeeded by: Thom de Graaf

Minister of Health, Welfare and Sport
- In office 22 August 1994 – 22 July 2002
- Prime Minister: Wim Kok
- Preceded by: Jo Ritzen (Ad interim) as Minister of Welfare, Health and Culture
- Succeeded by: Eduard Bomhoff

Personal details
- Born: Else Eilers; 22 March 1932 Amsterdam, Netherlands
- Died: 8 February 2014 (aged 81) Bilthoven, Netherlands
- Cause of death: Assassination
- Party: Democrats 66 (from 1968)
- Spouse: Jan Borst (m. 1960; died 1988)
- Children: 3 children
- Relatives: Piet Borst (brother in law)
- Education: University of Amsterdam (Bachelor of Medical Sciences, Master of Medicine, Doctor of Medicine, Doctor of Philosophy)

Else "Els" Borst-Eilers (Dutch pronunciation: [ˈɛlsə ˈʔɛlz bɔrst ˈɛilərs]; 22 March 1932 – 8 February 2014) was a Dutch politician of the Democrats 66 (D66) party and physician. She was granted the honorary title of Minister of State on 21 December 2012.

Borst worked as a medical researcher at the Academic Medical Center from 1958 until 1962 and as a physician from 1962 until 1976. Borst also worked as director of the blood bank at the University Medical Center Utrecht from 1969 until 1976. She served as the University Medical Center Utrecht hospital administrator from 1976 until 1985. Borst was selected as Vice Chairwoman of the Health Council, serving from 1 January 1986 until 22 August 1994. Borst also served as a professor of medical ethics at the University of Amsterdam from 1 July 1992 until 22 August 1994. After the election of 1994 Borst was appointed as Minister of Health, Welfare and Sport in the Cabinet Kok I, taking office on 3 August 1998. After the Leader of the Democrats 66 Hans van Mierlo announced he was stepping down five months before the election of 1998, he endorsed Borst as his successor. After Van Mierlo stood down on 15 February 1998, Borst was chosen to succeed him and became the Leader of the Democrats 66 and the Lijsttrekker (top candidate) of the Democrats 66 for the election of 1998. The Democrats 66 suffered a small big loss, losing 10 seats and now had 14 seats in the House of Representatives. Borst was elected as a Member of the House of Representatives and became the Parliamentary leader of the Democrats 66 in the House of Representatives on 19 May 1998. Borst stepped down as Leader of the Democrats 66 and Parliamentary leader in the House of Representatives in favor of Thom de Graaf on 30 May 1998. The following cabinet formation resulted in a continuing coalition agreement between the Labour Party (PvdA) and the People's Party for Freedom and Democracy (VVD) to form a Cabinet Kok II with Borst continuing as Minister of Health, Welfare and Sport and also becoming Deputy Prime Minister, taking office on 3 August 1998. In 2001 Borst announced her retirement from national politics and that she would not stand for the election of 2002.

Following her retirement Borst occupied numerous seats as a nonprofit director for supervisory boards for non-governmental organizations (Dutch Cancer Society, Netherlands Cancer Institute, Helen Dowling Institute, Institute for Health Services Research, National Committee for 4 and 5 May and the Brain Foundation) and as an advocate for cancer research. Borst continued to comment on political affairs as a stateswoman until her death on 8 February 2014 when she was murdered by a mentally unstable man in her home.

== Early life and education ==
Borst attended the Barlaeus Gymnasium of Amsterdam graduating in 1950. The same school was attended by People's Party for Freedom and Democracy (VVD) leader Frits Bolkestein, who was one class below her. Between 1950 and 1958, she followed a medical education at the University of Amsterdam where she obtained her medical degree in 1958. Subsequently, Borst worked as a resident physician at the hospital Onze Lieve Vrouwe Gasthuis in Amsterdam where she specialized in pediatric medicine and immunohaematology. In 1965 Borst started writing her doctoral thesis, while working as a medical scientist at Utrecht University, researching immunohaematology. In 1972, she received her Doctor of Philosophy degree at the University of Amsterdam following research on the development and prevention of rhesus immunisation.

== Career ==
In 1969, she was the head of the Bloodbank of the University Hospital of Utrecht, and in 1976, she became medical director of that hospital. In 1986, she left this position to become vice-chair of the Health Council, which she combined from 1992 with a position as professor in "evaluating medical actions" at the University of Amsterdam. In the Health Council, she chaired the committees on immunisation, genetics and medical ethics. Borst held several other positions in the medical world: she was chairperson of the College for Blood Transfusion as well as of the Committee on Research in Medical Ethics. In 1968, she joined the Democrats 66, and was active as a rank-and-file member. In 1976, for instance, when the Democrats 66 had lost nearly all its members and performed particularly bad in the polls, Borst was a volunteer in the promotion and revitalization campaign of the party, led by Jan Terlouw.

=== Political career ===
In 1994, Borst became minister of Health for the Democrats 66 in the First cabinet of Wim Kok. As a minister, Borst was known for two things, for introducing progressive legislation in medical ethics and for her attempts to reform the medical system to better cope with the aging population.

In 2001, she implemented a law legalizing Euthanasia in the Netherlands under certain extraordinary conditions, and only when extensive protocols had been followed by the physician, and subject to an obligation of full reporting to a governing body. The law (Dutch: de Wet Toetsing levensbeëindiging en hulp bij zelfdoding, law on the legal review of euthanasia and assisted suicide) is considered her most important contribution in politics.

Other progressive decisions she is responsible for include:

- In 1994, she strengthened the rights of patients, giving them the right to information and privacy, and the explicit right to refuse treatment.
- In 1996, she implemented the law on organ donation. As a result of the law, all Dutch citizens are asked when whether they wanted to become organ donor when they are 18 years old.
- In 2001, the law on foetal tissue was passed, which legalized the scientific use of foetal tissue for medical research applications, if the parents agreed and if the foetal tissue was the result of an abortion or miscarriage.
- In 2002, she prevented xenotransplantation.
- In 2002, she gave permission to the Women on Waves group to offer pregnant women the abortion pill on board their boat, Aurora.
- She also defended the Dutch system of soft drugs.

She faced political problems preparing the Dutch medical system for the aging of the population. An important part of her reforms of the medical system was to integrate the health insurance system (which had a public and private part), achieving that all citizens would pay the same amount for the same coverage. Although her ministry's budget was drastically increased during this period, she still had to limit the budgets of the hospitals. This led to a problem of long waiting lists for simple medical procedures. From both the political left and the political right she was criticized for what was seen as her mismanagement of the medical system.

In the 1998 elections, Borst succeeded Hans van Mierlo as Lijsttrekker (top candidate) for the Democrats 66. She was parachuted by the party's leadership in a press-conference where Van Mierlo announced her candidacy with the words: "It's a girl, and we call her Els." Words which were similar to those that parents use to announce the birth of their new born child. Although Borst lost the elections – her party lost ten of its twenty-four seats – she remained the minister of Health, and became deputy-prime-minister. During the formation talks Borst served as Parliamentary leader of the Democrats 66 in the House of Representatives of the Netherlands from 19 May 1998 until 30 May 1998 and was the Informateur for the Democrats 66.

After the parliamentary inquiry in the El Al Flight 1862 (Bijlmer Plane Crash), Borst faced a motion of no confidence in June 1999. The inquiry committee had concluded that Borst and her ministry of Health did not react well to the health problems of survivors of the disaster. The motion was rejected by parliament after an eighteen-hour-long debate.

After a 2001 interview in the NRC Handelsblad, Borst also faced another motion of no-confidence. In the interview she had said "It has been done" (Dutch: "Het is volbracht") on completing the law on euthanasia. Which according to the Bible are the last words of Jesus, on the cross. The orthodox Protestant parties ChristianUnion (ChristenUnie or CU) and Reformed Political Party (SGP), who had opposed euthanasia were insulted by this. Although the motion was not carried by parliament, Borst made her apologies for those words to parliament.

During her ministry, she became a member of the Institute of Medicine in Washington, D.C., and a fellow of the Royal College of Physicians in Edinburgh.

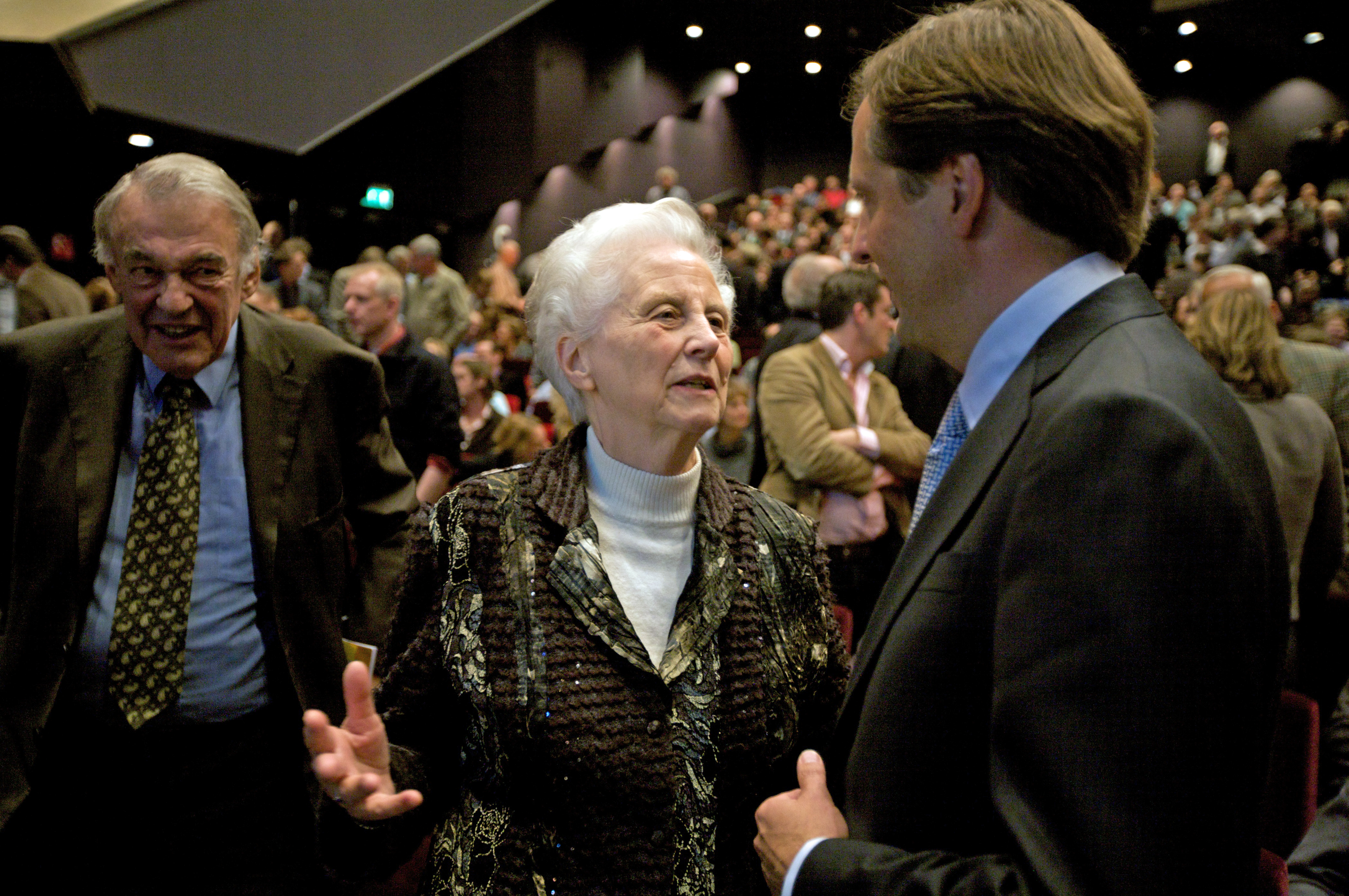
Hans van Mierlo, Els Borst and Alexander Pechtold at a Democrats 66 party conference on 7 November 2009.

== Later life ==
Before the 2002 elections, she retired from political life. On 8 February 2003 she became honorary member of the Democrats 66. Borst held many positions in public life, serving as member of the Remembrance of the Dead and Liberation Day Committees. She also held many positions in the medical world: she was chairperson of the board of NIVEL (National Institute for Scientific Research in Medicine), chairperson of the Federation of Dutch Cancer Patients Organizations and chair of the advisory board of the Brain Foundation of the Netherlands.

== Murder and trial ==
Borst was found dead on the evening of 10 February 2014 in the garage at her home in Bilthoven by two close friends. The eighty-one-year-old former politician was reported to be in good health after recovering from breast cancer a few years before. Dutch police concluded that Borst died on 8 February, just hours after attending a party congress of the Democrats 66 in Amsterdam, where she was reported to be visibly active and upbeat and left the party congress on her own and walked to the Amsterdam Centraal railway station nearby.

On 1 September 2015 the Public Prosecution Service released a statement that Borst died from forty-one stab wounds to her head, neck and hands. On 26 January 2015 police announced that a man with a criminal record had been arrested based on a DNA match; this man was arrested two weeks earlier on suspicion of involvement in the murder of his sister. Early in 2016 he confessed to the murder of his sister (almost a year after the murder of Borst). He said he killed his sister because they had different opinions on abortion and euthanasia. In February 2016 he confessed to having killed Borst because divine inspiration told him to do so, holding her responsible for the Dutch policy on euthanasia. Later he stated he had no intention to kill Mrs Borst, but wanted to ask her the address of former prime minister Wim Kok. When she refused to give the address, he remembered Borst had been responsible for the policy on euthanasia. On 13 April 2016 Van U. was convicted of the two murders and sentenced to TBS (Involuntary commitment) on the grounds of a diagnosis of chronic paranoid psychosis in the context of schizophrenia.

On 16 March 2017 the Court of Appeal of The Hague declared Van U. only partially unaccountable for the murders and sentenced him to eight years in prison and TBS.

== Decorations ==
Honours
Ribbon bar	Honour	Country	Date	Comment
	Knight of the Order of the Netherlands Lion	Netherlands	10 May 1989	
	Officer of the Order of Orange-Nassau	Netherlands	10 December 2002	
Honorific Titles
Ribbon bar	Honour	Country	Date	Comment
	Minister of State	Netherlands	21 December 2012	Style of Excellency
Awards
Ribbon bar	Awards	Organization	Date	Comment
	Honorary Member	Democrats 66	10 February 2003	

Party political offices
Preceded by Hans van Mierlo	Leader of the Democrats 66; 1998	Succeeded by Thom de Graaf
Preceded by Hans van Mierlo; 1994	Lijsttrekker of the Democrats 66; 1998	Succeeded by Thom de Graaf; 2002
Preceded by Thom de Graaf	Parliamentary leader of the Democrats 66 in the House of Representatives; 1998	Succeeded by Thom de Graaf
Political offices
Preceded by Jo Ritzen; Ad interim as Minister of Welfare, Health and Culture	Minister of Health, Welfare and Sport; 1994–2002	Succeeded by Eduard Bomhoff
Preceded by Hans Dijkstal	Deputy Prime Minister; 1998–2002; Served alongside: Annemarie Jorritsma	Succeeded by Eduard Bomhoff
Preceded by Hans van Mierlo	Deputy Prime Minister; 1998–2002; Served alongside: Annemarie Jorritsma	Succeeded by Johan Remkes
Civic offices
Unknown	Vice Chairwoman of the Health Council; 1986–1994	Unknown
