= Thom de Graaf =

Dutch politician and jurist (born 1957)

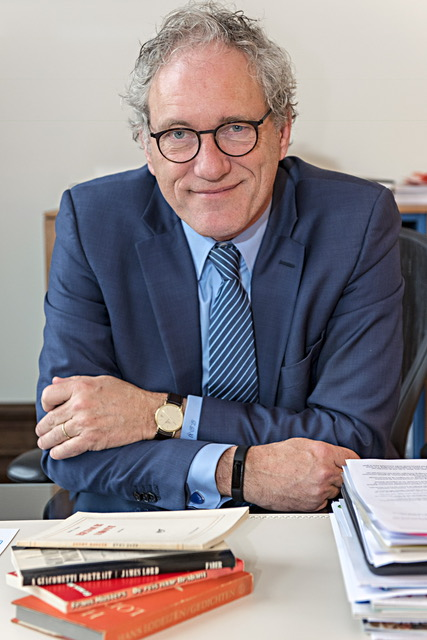
- de Graaf in 2018

Vice-President of the Council of State
- In office 1 November 2018 – 1 July 2026
- Monarch: Willem-Alexander
- Preceded by: Piet Hein Donner
- Succeeded by: Sybrand van Haersma Buma

Parliamentary leader in the Senate
- In office 9 June 2015 – 26 June 2018
- Preceded by: Roger van Boxtel
- Succeeded by: Hans Engels
- Parliamentary group: Democrats 66

Member of the Senate
- In office 7 June 2011 – 20 September 2018

Mayor of Nijmegen
- In office 8 January 2007 – 1 February 2012
- Preceded by: Guusje ter Horst
- Succeeded by: Wim Dijkstra (ad interim)

Deputy Prime Minister of the Netherlands
- In office 27 May 2003 – 23 March 2005 Serving with Gerrit Zalm
- Prime Minister: Jan Peter Balkenende
- Preceded by: Johan Remkes; Roelf de Boer
- Succeeded by: Laurens Jan Brinkhorst

Minister for Governmental Reform and Kingdom Relations
- In office 27 May 2003 – 23 March 2005
- Prime Minister: Jan Peter Balkenende
- Preceded by: Office established
- Succeeded by: Alexander Pechtold

Leader of the Democrats 66
- In office 30 May 1998 – 22 January 2003
- Preceded by: Els Borst
- Succeeded by: Boris Dittrich

Parliamentary leader in the House of Representatives
- In office 30 May 1998 – 22 January 2003
- Preceded by: Els Borst
- Succeeded by: Boris Dittrich
- In office 21 November 1997 – 19 May 1998
- Preceded by: Gerrit Jan Wolffensperger
- Succeeded by: Els Borst
- Parliamentary group: Democrats 66

Member of the House of Representatives
- In office 17 May 1994 – 27 May 2003

Personal details
- Born: Thomas Carolus de Graaf; 11 June 1957 (age 69) Amsterdam, Netherlands
- Party: Democrats 66 (from 1977)
- Children: 2
- Parent: Theo de Graaf (1912–1983) (father)
- Education: Radboud University Nijmegen (Bachelor of Laws, Master of Laws)
- Occupation: Politician; civil servant; jurist; researcher; management consultant; nonprofit director; trade association executive; education administrator; sport administrator; Professor
- Website: Vice-President of the Council of State (in Dutch)

Thomas Carolus de Graaf (Dutch pronunciation: [ˈtoːmɑz də ˈɣraːf]; (Note: Thomas in isolation: [ˈtoːmɑs].) born 11 June 1957) is a Dutch jurist and politician. First elected to the House of Representatives in 1994, he became parliamentary leader of the Democrats 66 (D66) in 1997, and party leader the following year. He became Deputy Prime Minister of the Netherlands in 2003, but resigned two years later following the defeat of his bill aiming to introduce direct mayoral elections. He subsequently served as mayor of Nijmegen between 2007 and 2012, and was elected to the Senate in 2011, leading his party's Senate group from 2015 until 2018. On 1 November 2018, he was appointed Vice-President of the Council of State, serving in this capacity until 1 July 2026.

== Early life and education ==
De Graaf was born in Amsterdam in 1957. De Graaf's father, Theo de Graaf, was a Catholic People's Party member of parliament and from 1968 until 1977 mayor of Nijmegen. De Graaf attended the Stedelijk Gymnasium Nijmegen from April 1969 until May 1975 and applied at the Radboud University Nijmegen in June 1975 majoring in Law obtaining a Bachelor of Laws degree in June 1977 and worked as a student researcher before graduating with a Master of Laws degree in July 1981.

De Graaf served on the municipal council of Nijmegen from May 1978 until April 1979. De Graaf worked as a researcher at the Radboud University Nijmegen and the Centrum voor Parlementaire Geschiedenis from July 1981 until September 1985. De Graaf worked as a civil servant for the Ministry of the Interior from September 1985 until May 1994. He worked at the Department for Law Enforcement from September 1985 until February 1986, as deputy director-general of the Department for Legislative Affairs from February 1986 until August 1988, as deputy director-general of the Department for Legal Affairs from August 1988 until September 1991, and as deputy director-general of the Department for Law Enforcement from September 1991 until May 1994. De Graaf served on the municipal council of Leiden from April 1990 until May 1994.

== Political career ==
De Graaf was elected to the House of Representatives in 1994 general election, taking office on 17 May 1994. He served as his party's spokesperson for the interior, Kingdom relations, and law enforcement, and as deputy spokesperson for foreign affairs and European affairs. He was also vice-chairman of the parliamentary inquiry committee that looked into the investigative methods used by the Dutch inter-regional police force, leading to the resignation in 1994 of the Minister for Internal Affairs, Ed van Thijn.

After the parliamentary leader of the Democrats 66 in the House of Representatives Gerrit Jan Wolffensperger announced that he was stepping down following increasing criticism of his leadership, De Graaf was chosen as his successor, taking office on 21 November 1997. In the 1998 general election, the new Leader of the Democrats 66 Els Borst was elected to the House of Representatives and became parliamentary leader, taking office on 19 May 1998. Following the 1998 cabinet formation, Borst opted to remain Minister of Health, Welfare and Sport in the Kok II cabinet and unexpectedly announced that she was stepping down as party leader. De Graaf announced his candidacy to succeed her, and won the leadership election defeating fellow member of parliament Roger van Boxtel. He took office as party leader on 30 May 1998.

For the 2002 general election, De Graaf served as the lead candidate. The Democrats 66 suffered a big loss, falling back from fourteen to seven seats. The party lost another seat in the 2003 general election, and was left with six seats in the House of Representatives. On 22 January 2003, De Graaf announced his resignation as party leader on account of the election defeats, but continued to serve in the House of Representatives, chairing the parliamentary committee for Kingdom Relations. Following the 2003 cabinet formation, De Graaf was appointed as Deputy Prime Minister and Minister for Governmental Reform and Kingdom Relations in the Balkenende II cabinet, taking office on 27 May 2003.

De Graaf resigned on 23 March 2005 after his proposal for the introduction of democratically elected mayors had been rejected in the Senate, with a deciding vote cast by the Labour Party group under the leadership of Ed van Thijn. The proposal was especially important as it had become a symbol of the government reform that D66 had pursued since its founding. Alexander Pechtold succeeded him in the cabinet.

=== Semi-retirement ===
De Graaf semi-retired from active politics and became active in the public sector and occupied numerous seats as a nonprofit director on several supervisory boards (Centrum voor Parlementaire Geschiedenis, Consumentenbond and the Anne Vondeling prize) and served on several state commissions and councils on behalf of the government (Public Pension Funds APB, De Koning Commission, National Committee for 4 and 5 May, Netherlands Film Fund and the Advisory Council for Spatial Planning). De Graaf also worked as a sport administrator for the Royal Dutch Football Association. De Graaf also served as a professor of Ethics for the Royal Marechaussee at the Royal Military Academy from July 2005 until September 2010.

=== Return ===
In December 2006 De Graaf was nominated as mayor of Nijmegen, taking office on 8 January 2007. In January 2012 De Graaf was nominated as chairman of the executive board of the Universities of Applied Sciences association, he resigned as mayor the same day he was installed chairman from serving from 1 February 2012 until 1 November 2018. De Graaf was elected to the Senate in the 2011 Senate election, taking office on 7 June 2011. He served as a chair of the parliamentary committee for Kingdom Relations and spokesperson for the interior, Kingdom relations, European affairs, defence and immigration and asylum affairs. After the 2015 Senate election, De Graaf was chosen as parliamentary leader of the Democrats 66, taking office on 9 June 2015. In June 2018, De Graaf was nominated as Vice-President of the Council of State, he resigned as parliamentary leader on 26 June 2018 and as a member of the Senate on 20 September 2018, and was installed as Vice-President of the Council of State on 1 November 2018. He resigned from the Council of State on 1 July 2026. He received the honorary title of Minister of State the same month.

== Decorations ==
Honours
Ribbon bar	Honour	Country	Date	Comment
	Knight of the Order of the Holy Sepulchre	Holy See	4 April 2004	
	Officer of the Order of Oranje-Nassau	Netherlands	23 May 2005	

== Notes ==
Party political offices
Preceded by Gerrit Jan Wolffensperger	Parliamentary leader of the Democrats 66 in the House of Representatives; 1997–1998	Succeeded by Els Borst
Preceded by Els Borst	Parliamentary leader of the Democrats 66 in the House of Representatives; 1998–2003	Succeeded by Boris Dittrich
Preceded by Els Borst	Leader of the Democrats 66; 1998–2003	Succeeded by Boris Dittrich
Preceded by Els Borst; 1998	Lead candidate of the Democrats 66; 2002, 2003	Succeeded by Alexander Pechtold; 2006
Preceded by Roger van Boxtel	Parliamentary leader of the Democrats 66 in the Senate; 2015–2018	Succeeded by Hans Engels
Political offices
Preceded by Johan Remkes; Roelf de Boer	Deputy Prime Minister; 2003–2005; Served alongside: Gerrit Zalm	Succeeded by Laurens Jan Brinkhorst
New office	Minister for Governmental Reform and Kingdom Relations; 2003–2005	Succeeded by Alexander Pechtold
Preceded by Guusje ter Horst	Mayor of Nijmegen; 2007–2012	Succeeded by Wim Dijkstra; Ad interim
Preceded by Piet Hein Donner	Vice-President of the Council of State; 2018–2026	Succeeded by Sybrand van Haersma Buma
