= Ad Havermans =

Dutch politician (1934–2022)

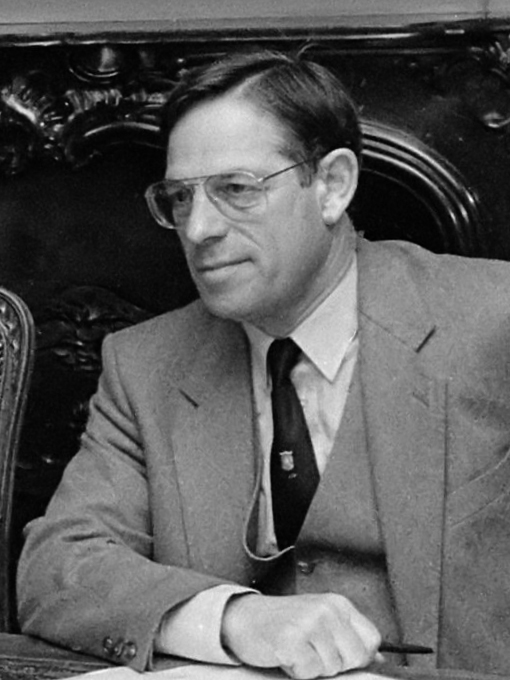
- Havermans in 1986

Mayor of The Hague
- In office 1 September 1985 – 1 August 1996
- Preceded by: Frans Schols
- Succeeded by: Wim Deetman

Mayor of Doetinchem
- In office 1 September 1974 – 1 September 1985
- Preceded by: Jacques Marie Johannes Cornelissen
- Succeeded by: Jan Fokkens

Mayor of Druten
- In office 1 January 1969 – 1 September 1974
- Preceded by: Theo Reinders
- Succeeded by: Henk Geurts

Mayor of Pannerden
- In office 16 June 1963 – 1 January 1969
- Preceded by: Johannes Daalderop
- Succeeded by: Jan ter Veer

Personal details
- Born: Adrianus Josephus Elisabeth Havermans; 25 August 1934 Bergen op Zoom, Netherlands
- Died: 8 March 2022 (aged 87) The Hague, Netherlands
- Party: KVP (until 1980); Christian Democratic Appeal (since 1980)
- Education: Leiden University

Adrianus Josephus Elisabeth Havermans (25 August 1934 – 8 March 2022) was a Dutch politician. A member of the Catholic People's Party and later the Christian Democratic Appeal, he served as Mayor of The Hague from 1985 to 1996. He died in The Hague on 8 March 2022, at the age of 87.
