= Provincial executive =

The provincial executive (Dutch: Gedeputeerde Staten, GS) is the executive branch of government of a province in the Netherlands. It is the equivalent of the municipal executive at the provincial level. The provincial executive consists of the King's Commissioner (chair) and three to seven deputies (Dutch: gedeputeerden).

The deputies are chosen by the provincial council, the elected assembly of the province. Each deputy has their own portfolio for which they prepare, coordinate and plan policy and legislation for the provincial council and execute legislation. The deputies have the duty to inform the provincial council on all aspects of their policy. The provincial executive functions as a collegial body and most decisions are taken by consensus.

== Composition ==
Province	King's commissioner	Executive
Drenthe	Agnes Mulder (CDA)	BBB, PvdA, VVD, CDA
Flevoland	Arjen Gerritsen (VVD)	BBB, VVD, PVV, CU, SGP
Friesland	Arno Brok (VVD)	BBB, CDA, FNP, CU
Gelderland	Daniël Wigboldus (Independent)	BBB, VVD, CDA, CU, SGP
Groningen	René Paas (CDA)	BBB, PvdA, GL, VVD, Indep.
Limburg	Emile Roemer (SP)	BBB, VVD, CDA, PvdA, SP
North Brabant	Ina Adema (VVD)	VVD, GL, PvdA, SP, D66, LB
North Holland	Arthur van Dijk (VVD)	BBB, VVD, GL, PvdA
Overijssel	Andries Heidema (CU)	BBB, VVD, GL, PvdA, SGP
South Holland	Wouter Kolff (VVD)	PRO, VVD, BBB, CDA
Utrecht	Hans Oosters (PvdA)	GL, VVD, D66, CDA, PvdA
Zeeland	Hugo de Jonge (CDA)	BBB, CDA, SGP, VVD

== See also ==
- Provincial politics in the Netherlands
