= Johan Remkes =

Dutch politician (born 1951)

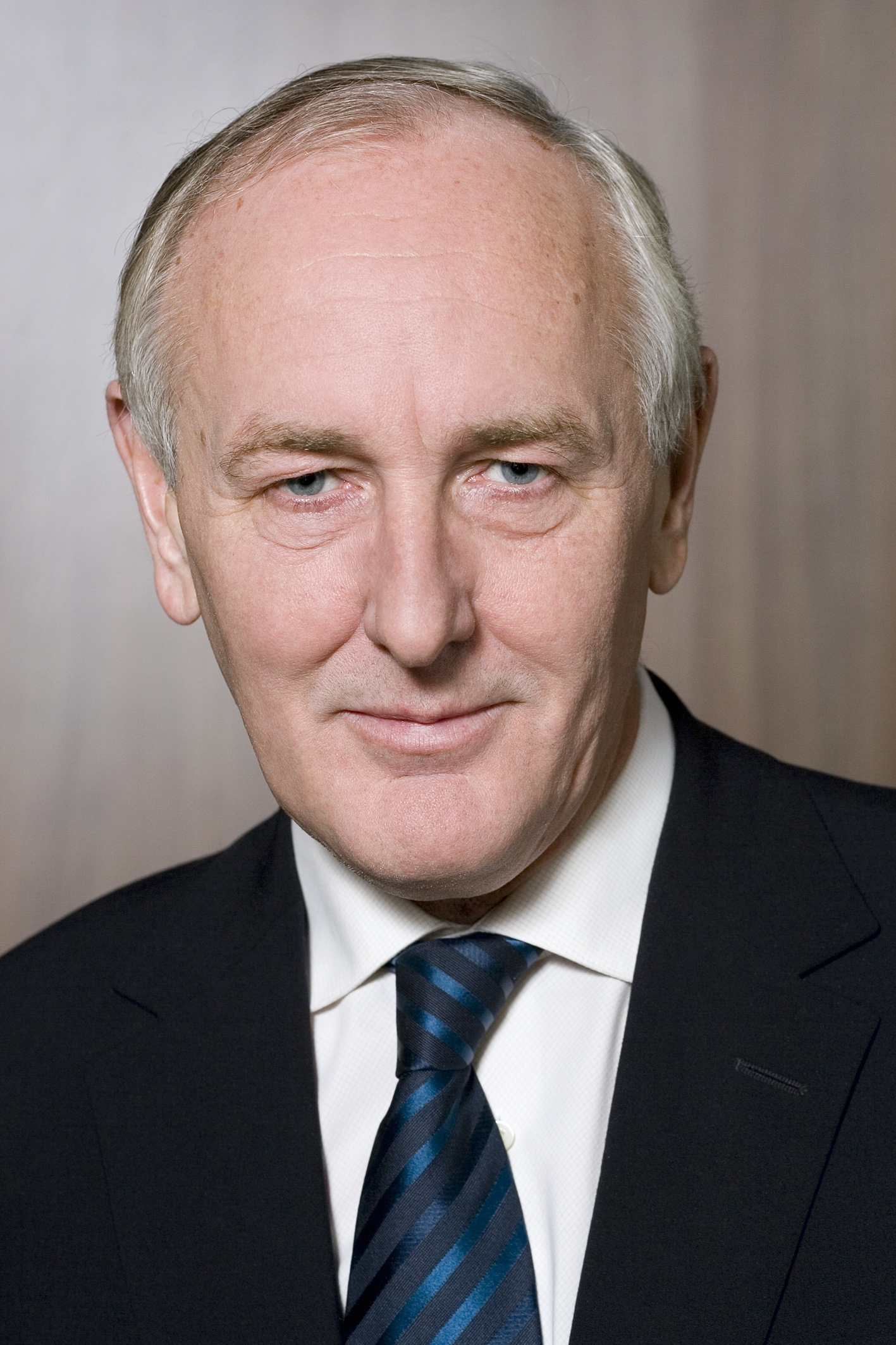
- Remkes in 2010

King's Commissioner of Limburg
- Acting
- In office 19 April 2021 – 1 December 2021
- Monarch: Willem-Alexander
- Preceded by: Theo Bovens
- Succeeded by: Emile Roemer

Mayor of The Hague
- Acting
- In office 11 October 2019 – 1 July 2020
- Preceded by: Boudewijn Revis (ad interim)
- Succeeded by: Jan van Zanen

King's Commissioner of North Holland
- In office 1 July 2010 – 1 January 2019
- Monarchs: Beatrix (2010–2013); Willem-Alexander (2013–2019)
- Preceded by: Elisabeth Post (ad interim)
- Succeeded by: Arthur van Dijk

Minister of the Interior and Kingdom Relations
- In office 22 July 2002 – 22 February 2007
- Prime Minister: Jan Peter Balkenende
- Preceded by: Klaas de Vries
- Succeeded by: Guusje ter Horst

Deputy Prime Minister of the Netherlands
- In office 22 July 2002 – 27 May 2003 Serving with Eduard Bomhoff (2002); Roelf de Boer (2002–2003)
- Prime Minister: Jan Peter Balkenende
- Preceded by: Annemarie Jorritsma; Els Borst
- Succeeded by: Gerrit Zalm; Thom de Graaf

State Secretary for Housing, Spatial Planning and the Environment
- In office 3 August 1998 – 22 July 2002
- Prime Minister: Wim Kok
- Preceded by: Dick Tommel
- Succeeded by: Pieter van Geel

Member of the House of Representatives
- In office 30 November 2006 – 17 June 2010
- In office 30 January 2003 – 27 May 2003
- In office 23 May 2002 – 22 July 2002
- In office 26 October 1993 – 3 August 1998

Personal details
- Born: Johannes Wijnandus Remkes; 15 June 1951 (age 75) Zuidbroek, Netherlands
- Party: People's Party for Freedom and Democracy (from 1973)
- Spouse: Nicolette Pinkster (m. 1984)
- Education: University of Groningen (BEc)
- Occupation: Politician · Civil servant · Corporate director · Nonprofit director

Johannes Wijnandus "Johan" Remkes (born 15 June 1951) is a Dutch politician and nonprofit director who served as Deputy Prime Minister of the Netherlands from 2002 to 2003 under Prime Minister Jan Peter Balkenende. He is a member of the People's Party for Freedom and Democracy (VVD).

Remkes studied Economics at the University of Groningen obtaining a Bachelor of Economics degree. Remkes served as chairman of the political youth organisation JOVD from July 1975 until November 1977. Remkes worked as member of the Provincial-Executive of Groningen from May 1982 until October 1993. Remkes became a member of the House of Representatives on 26 October 1993 serving as a frontbencher and spokesperson for Housing. After the election of 1998 Remkes was appointed as State Secretary for Housing, Spatial Planning and the Environment under the Second Kok cabinet taking office on 3 August 1998. After the election of 2002 Remkes was appointed as Deputy Prime Minister and Minister of the Interior and Kingdom Relations in the First Balkenende cabinet, which took office on 22 July 2002 but fell just 87 days into its term. After the election of 2003 Remkes continued as Minister of the Interior and Kingdom Relations in the Second Balkenende cabinet. The cabinet fell on 30 June 2006 and was replaced with the caretaker Third Balkenende cabinet with Remkes retaining his position. After the election of 2006 Remkes returned to the House of Representatives on 30 November 2006 and served as a frontbencher and spokesperson for the Interior. In March 2010, Remkes announced that he would not stand for the election of 2010 and declined to serve in new cabinet.

Remkes continued to be active in politics and in June 2010 was nominated as the next King's Commissioner of North Holland serving from 1 July 2010 until 1 January 2019. Remkes also became active in the public sector as non-profit director and serves on several state commissions and councils on behalf of the government. In September 2019, Remkes was appointed as Acting Mayor of The Hague serving from 11 October 2019 until 1 July 2020.

From 19 April 2021 until 1 December 2021 Remkes was Acting King's Commissioner of Limburg.

== Early career ==
Remkes was born in Zuidbroek, Groningen. Remkes applied at the University of Groningen in June 1970 majoring in Economics and obtaining a Bachelor of Economics degree in June 1972. Remkes served on the Municipal Council of Groningen from April 1978 until May 1982 and served on the Provincial-Council of Groningen from May 1978 until October 1993 and as a member of the Provincial-Executive of Groningen from May 1982 until October 1993 and served again on the Municipal Council of Groningen from May 1994 until July 1996.

== House of Representatives ==
Remkes became a Member of the House of Representatives after the resignation of Nell Ginjaar-Maas taking office on 26 October 1993 and served as a frontbencher and spokesperson for Housing and deputy spokesperson for the Interior, Economic Affairs, Tax and Customs and Media.

== Cabinets ==
After the election of 1998 Remkes was appointed as State Secretary for Housing, Spatial Planning and the Environment in the Cabinet Kok II taking office on 3 August 1998. The Cabinet Kok II resigned on 16 April 2002 following the conclusions of the NIOD report into the Srebrenica massacre during the Bosnian War and continued to serve in a demissionary capacity. After the election of 2002 Remkes returned as a Member of the House of Representatives on 23 May 2002. Following the cabinet formation of 2002 Remkes was appointed as Deputy Prime Minister and Minister of the Interior and Kingdom Relations in the Cabinet Balkenende I taking office on 22 July 2002.

The Cabinet Balkenende I fell just 87 days into its term following a major leadership crisis in the Pim Fortuyn List (LPF) party and resigned on 16 October 2002 and the cabinet continued to serve in a demissionary capacity. election of 2003 Remkes again returned as a Member of the House of Representatives on 30 January 2003. Following the cabinet formation of 2003 Remkes continued as Minister of the Interior and Kingdom Relations but the position of Deputy Prime Minister was taken over by Minister of Finance Gerrit Zalm in the Cabinet Balkenende II taking office on 27 May 2003.

On 29 June 2006 the Democrats 66 retracted their support for the cabinet Balkenende II after criticizing the way Minister for Integration and Immigration Rita Verdonk (VVD) had handled the crisis around the naturalization of her party fellow elected to the House of Representatives Ayaan Hirsi Ali. On 7 July 2006 a rump cabinet Third Balkenende cabinet. He returned as a member of the House of Representatives after the inauguration of the Fourth Balkenende cabinet, serving from 30 November 2006 to 17 June 2010.

== King's Commissioner North Holland ==
Remkes remained in active politics, in June 2010 he was nominated as the next Kings's Commissioner of North Holland serving from 1 July 2010 until 1 January 2019. He also served on several state commissions and councils on behalf of the government (Staatscommissie parlementair stelsel (Parliamentary Reform Commission), Raad voor het Openbaar Bestuur (Council for Public Administration), Advisory Council for Spatial Planning and the Van Thijn Commission). After his retirement Remkes occupies numerous seats as a corporate director and nonprofit director for supervisory boards in the business and industry world and several international non-governmental organizations and research institutes. In 2018, he made known he would step down from the position in January 2019 to definitely retire from politics. He has been succeeded by former Haarlemmermeer alderman and also VVD politician Arthur van Dijk.

== Decorations ==
Honours
Ribbon bar	Honour	Country	Date	Comment
	Grand Officer of the Order of Leopold II	Belgium	15 May 2004	
	Commander of the Legion of Honour	France	10 June 2005	
	Grand Officer of the Order of the Oak Crown	Luxembourg	18 September 2006	
	Officer of the Order of Orange-Nassau	Netherlands	11 April 2007	
	Commander of the Order of the Netherlands Lion	Netherlands	18 December 2018	

Remkes received the honorary title of Minister of State in July 2026.

Political offices
Preceded by Dick Tommel	State Secretary for Housing, Spatial; Planning and the Environment; 1998–2002	Succeeded by Pieter van Geel
Preceded by Annemarie Jorritsma; Els Borst	Deputy Prime Minister of the Netherlands; 2002–2003; Served alongside: Eduard Bomhoff (2002); Roelf de Boer (2002–2003)	Succeeded by Gerrit Zalm; Thom de Graaf
Preceded by Klaas de Vries	Minister of the Interior and Kingdom Relations; 2002–2007	Succeeded by Guusje ter Horst
Preceded by Elisabeth Post; Acting	King's Commissioner of North Holland; 2010–2019	Succeeded by Arthur van Dijk
Preceded by Boudewijn Revis; Ad Interim	Mayor of The Hague; Acting; 2019–2020	Succeeded by Jan van Zanen
Preceded by Theo Bovens	King's Commissioner of Limburg; Acting; 2021	Succeeded by Emile Roemer
Non-profit organization positions
Preceded by Ed Nijpels	Chairman of the Youth Organisation Freedom and Democracy; 1975–1977	Succeeded by Gijs de Vries
