= List of mayors of The Hague =

Peace and Justice

Below is a list of mayors of The Hague since it was decided in 1824 that only one mayor at a time would govern the city.

== List ==
Portrait	Name	Term of office	Party
	Lodewijk Copes van Cattenburch (1771–1842)	23 February 1824 – 16 December 1842 (18 years, 296 days)	Independent (pro-government)
	Gerrit Hooft (1779–1872)	20 December 1842 – 15 May 1858 (15 years, 146 days) (Note: Acting Mayor until 28 March 1843)	Independent (pro-government)
	François Gevers Deynoot (1814–1882)	1 June 1858 – 1 June 1882 (24 years, 0 days)	Independent (anti-revolutionary)
	Jacob Gerard Patijn (1836–1911)	16 September 1882 – 8 September 1887 (4 years, 357 days)	Independent (liberal)
	Albert Johan Roest (1837–1920)	21 September 1887 – 1 July 1897 (9 years, 283 days)	Independent (liberal)
	Binnert de Beaufort (1852–1898)	15 September 1897 – 16 April 1898 (213 days)	Independent
	Johan van Harinxma thoe Slooten (1848–1904)	25 May 1898 – 4 April 1904 (5 years, 315 days)	Independent (liberal)
	Emile Sweerts de Landas Wyborgh (1852–1928)	15 July 1904 – 1 May 1911 (6 years, 290 days)	Anti-Revolutionary
	Joannes Coenraad Jansen	1 May 1911 – 1 August 1911 (92 days); Acting	Independent (liberal)
	Herman Adriaan van Karnebeek (1874–1942)	1 Augustus 1911 – 9 September 1918 (7 years, 8 days)	Independent (old liberal)
	Jacob Patijn (1873–1961)	30 September 1918 – 1 October 1930 (12 years, 1 day)	Independent (liberal)
	Lodewijk Bosch van Rosenthal (1852–1928)	1 December 1930 – 1 June 1934 (3 years, 182 days)	Christian Historical Union
	Salomon Jean René de Monchy (1880–1961)	1 July 1934 – 1 July 1940 (6 years, 0 days)	Independent (liberal)
	Cornelis Lodewijk van der Bilt	1 July 1940 – 15 June 1942 (1 year, 349 days); Acting	Liberal State Party
	Harmen Westra (1883–1959)	1 July 1942 – 15 March 1945 (2 years, 257 days)	National Socialist Movement
	Henri van Maasdijk	15 March 1945 – 7 May 1945 (53 days); Acting	National Socialist Movement
	Salomon de Monchy (1880–1961)	5 May 1945 – 1 January 1947 (1 year, 241 days)	Independent (liberal)
	Willem Visser (burgemeester) (1904–1975)	1 June 1947 – 27 May 1949 (1 year, 360 days)	Christian Historical Union
	Frans Schokking (1908–1990)	1 November 1949 – 1 August 1956 (6 years, 274 days)	Christian Historical Union
Hans Kolfschoten	Hans Kolfschoten (1908–1990)	10 February 1957 – 16 October 1968 (11 years, 249 days)	Catholic People's Party
Victor Marijnen	Victor Marijnen (1917–1975)	16 October 1968 – 5 April 1975 (6 years, 155 days)	Catholic People's Party
Henk Happel	Henk Happel	5 April 1975 – 14 October 1975 (192 days); Ad interim	Catholic People's Party
Frans Schols	Frans Schols (1926–2000)	14 October 1975 – 1 June 1985 (9 years, 230 days)	Catholic People's Party (1975–1980)
Frans Schols	Frans Schols (1926–2000)	14 October 1975 – 1 June 1985 (9 years, 230 days)	Christian Democratic Appeal (1980–1985)
Piet Vink	Piet Vink (1927–2002)	1 June 1985 – 1 September 1985 (92 days); Ad interim	Labour Party
Ad Havermans	Ad Havermans (born 1934)	1 September 1985 – 1 August 1996 (10 years, 335 days)	Christian Democratic Appeal
Peter Noordanus	Peter Noordanus (born 1948)	1 August 1996 – 1 December 1996 (122 days); Ad interim	Labour Party
Wim Deetman	Wim Deetman (born 1945)	1 December 1996 – 1 January 2008 (11 years, 31 days)	Christian Democratic Appeal
Jetta Klijnsma	Jetta Klijnsma (born 1957)	1 January 2008 – 26 March 2008 (85 days); Ad interim	Labour Party
Jozias van Aartsen	Jozias van Aartsen (born 1947)	26 March 2008 – 1 March 2017 (8 years, 340 days)	People's Party for Freedom and Democracy
	Tom de Bruijn (born 1948)	1 March 2017 – 17 March 2017 (16 days); Ad interim	Democrats 66
Pauline Krikke	Pauline Krikke (born 1961)	17 March 2017 – 6 October 2019 (2 years, 203 days)	People's Party for Freedom and Democracy
Boudewijn Revis	Boudewijn Revis (born 1974)	6 October 2019 – 12 October 2019 (6 days); Ad interim	People's Party for Freedom and Democracy
Johan Remkes	Johan Remkes (born 1951)	12 October 2019 – 1 July 2020 (263 days); Acting	People's Party for Freedom and Democracy
Jan van Zanen	Jan van Zanen (born 1961)	1 July 2020 – Incumbent (5 years, 288 days)	People's Party for Freedom and Democracy

== See also ==
- Timeline of The Hague
