= Municipal executive =

Executive board of a Dutch municipality

In the Netherlands, the municipal executive (Dutch: college van burgemeester en wethouders, oftentimes abbreviated to college van B en W; lit. 'college of mayor and aldermen') is the executive board of a municipality. It plays a central role in municipal politics in the Netherlands, similar to the communal college in Belgium. It consists of the mayor and the members of the municipal executive (aldermen).

== Composition ==
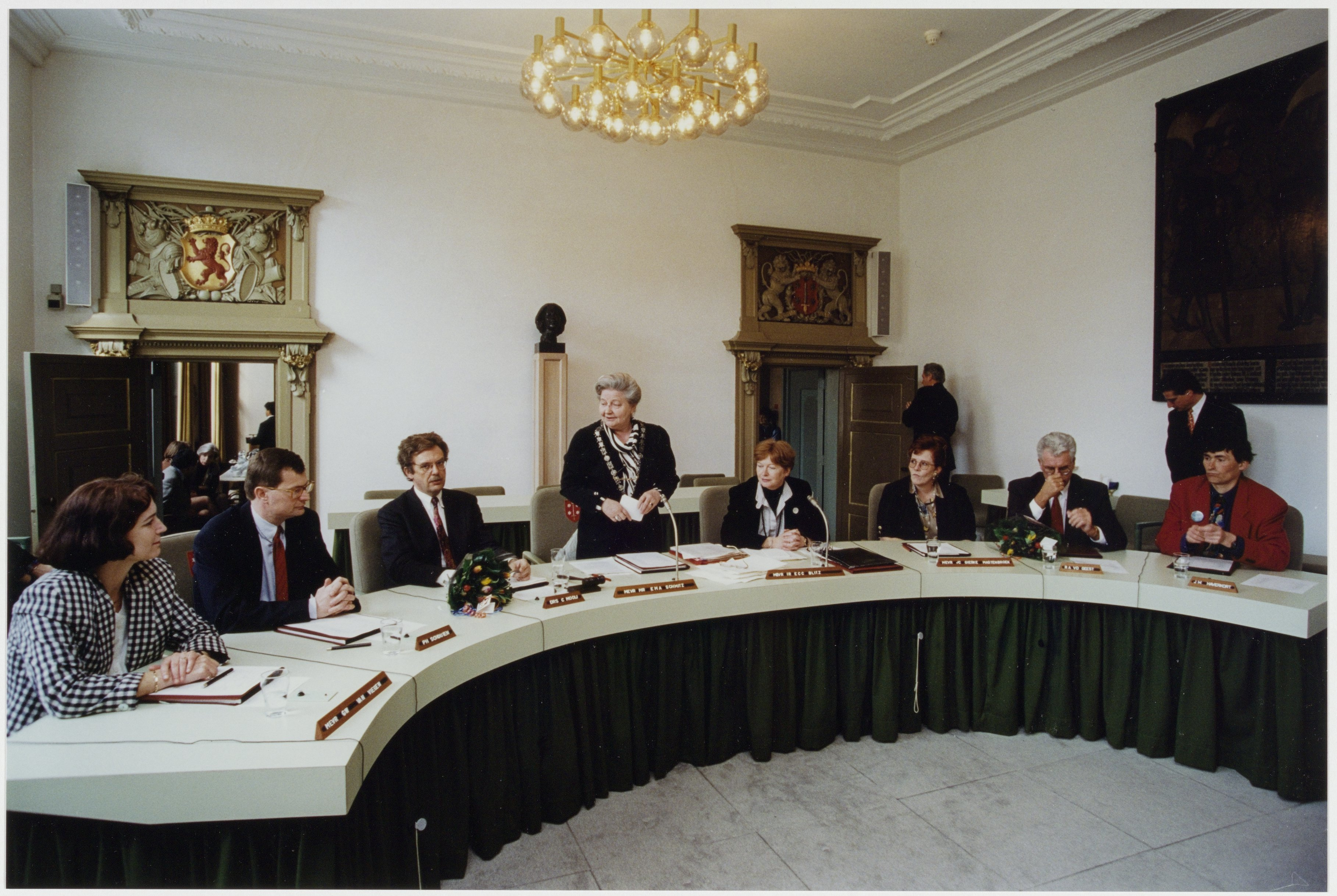
Municipal executive of Haarlem (1994)

=== Mayor ===
The mayor (Dutch: burgemeester, sometimes translated as 'burgomaster') is the chairperson of the municipal executive, and therefore holds the casting vote in the event of a tie. Their role is comparable to the roles of the Prime Minister in the cabinet, the King's Commissioner in the provincial executives, and the lieutenant governor in the executive councils of the Caribbean Netherlands.

The mayor is appointed by the monarch (de facto by the Minister of the Interior) for a renewable six-year term. Like the aldermen, the mayor has a portfolio, which always includes public order and safety. Most mayors are members of a political party, but they are expected to carry out their tasks in a non-partisan manner.

=== Aldermen ===
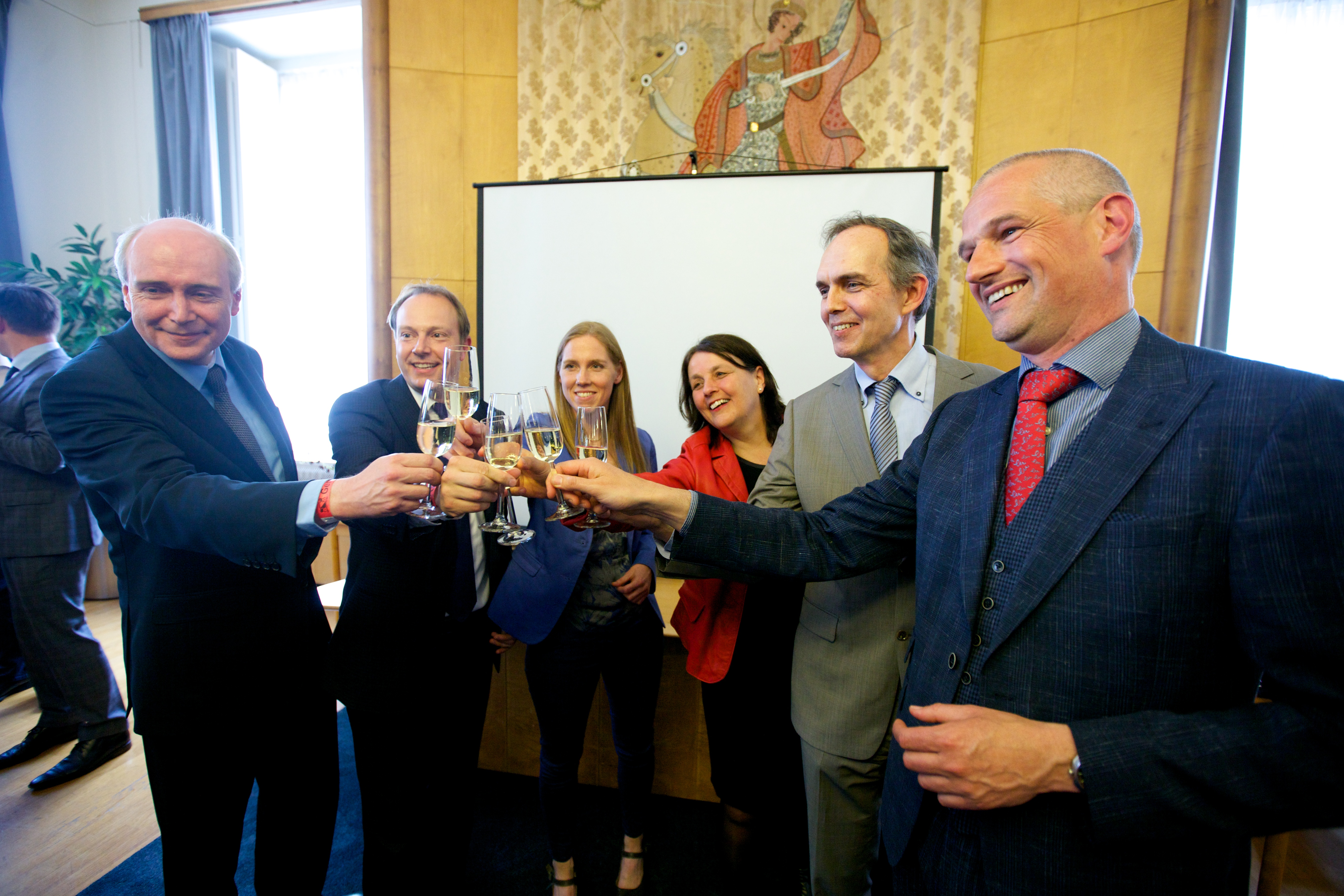
Aldermen of Utrecht (2014)

The aldermen (also alderwomen or alderpersons; Dutch: wethouders) are the board members of the municipal executive. Their role is comparable to the roles of the ministers in the cabinet and the deputies in the provincial executives. Other common translations include deputy mayors, vice mayors and portfolio holders, although the former titles may be reserved for aldermen who are empowered to act for the mayor in their absence (Dutch: locoburgemeester).

After every municipal election, the aldermen are elected to the municipal executive by the members of the municipal council. Usually, they elect sitting members of the municipal council, but it is also possible to nominate people from outside the council. (Note: Prior to the 2002 dualist reforms, aldermen could only be delegated from among the members of the municipal council and thus had to be residents of the municipality. Since 2002, non-members and even non-residents can be nominated for the position of alderman.) Unlike aldermen in English-speaking countries, wethouders cannot simultaneously be members of the municipal council. Therefore, municipal councillors must resign their seats when they are elected into the office of alderman. The municipal council also holds the power to remove an alderman from office by means of a motion of no confidence.

The aldermen are assigned portfolios within the municipal executive and, in this capacity, prepare, coordinate, and plan policy and legislation for the council as a whole. They are also charged with the day-to-day government of the municipality and the implementation of legislation. The aldermen report to the municipal council on all aspects of what is happening within their portfolios. The municipal executive functions as a committee that reaches decisions by way of consensus.

=== Quota ===
According to the Municipality Act (Dutch: Gemeentewet), the number of aldermen cannot exceed 20% of the number of members of the municipal council, but there must be at least two. In Dutch municipalities with 18,000 inhabitants or fewer, the office of alderman is a part-time position. In larger municipalities, the office is a full-time position, but the municipal council may opt to designate one or more portfolios as part-time positions, in which case the maximum number of aldermen is 25% of the number of municipal councillors.

=== Municipal secretary ===
The municipal secretary (Dutch: gemeentesecretaris), who is chosen by the municipal executive, is responsible for the day-to-day operation of the municipal executive and assists with administrative matters.

== Formation ==
A new executive is formed following municipal elections, held every four years. As it is rare for parties to win an absolute majority, negotiations take place to reach a coalition possessing a majority of seats in the municipal council. A minority government can be formed in case such attempts fail, or it can occur when the governing coalition collapses before the end of its term. Political arrangements from negotiations are laid out in an executive agreement. Since the council members vote for the members of the municipal executive, the municipal executive is also chosen along party lines. As a result, two different types of municipal executives exist:

- A "manifesto-based executive" (programmacollege) is elected on the basis of a manifesto by a majority vote of all members of the municipal council. Most municipal executives in the Netherlands are manifesto-based.
- A "mirror executive" (afspiegelingscollege) is an executive whose composition reflects the distribution of the major parties in the municipal council. For example, if the members of the municipal council are evenly split between three mainstream parties, the members of the executive board will also be evenly split between these three parties.

=== Alliances ===
Municipal councillors sometimes form party-based coalitions and vote in blocs to prevent members of opposing political parties from joining the executive board. This means that a party that does well in the municipal election may not be represented in the municipal executive. For example, from 2002 to 2006, the municipal executive of Rotterdam consisted of aldermen from right-wing parties (CDA, VVD and Leefbaar Rotterdam), while the Labour Party had been the second largest party in the municipal council. In Groningen, the left-wing parties (Labour Party, Socialist Party and Groenlinks) kept members of right-wing parties out of the executive, despite a strong performance in the 2006 election.
