= Municipal politics in the Netherlands =

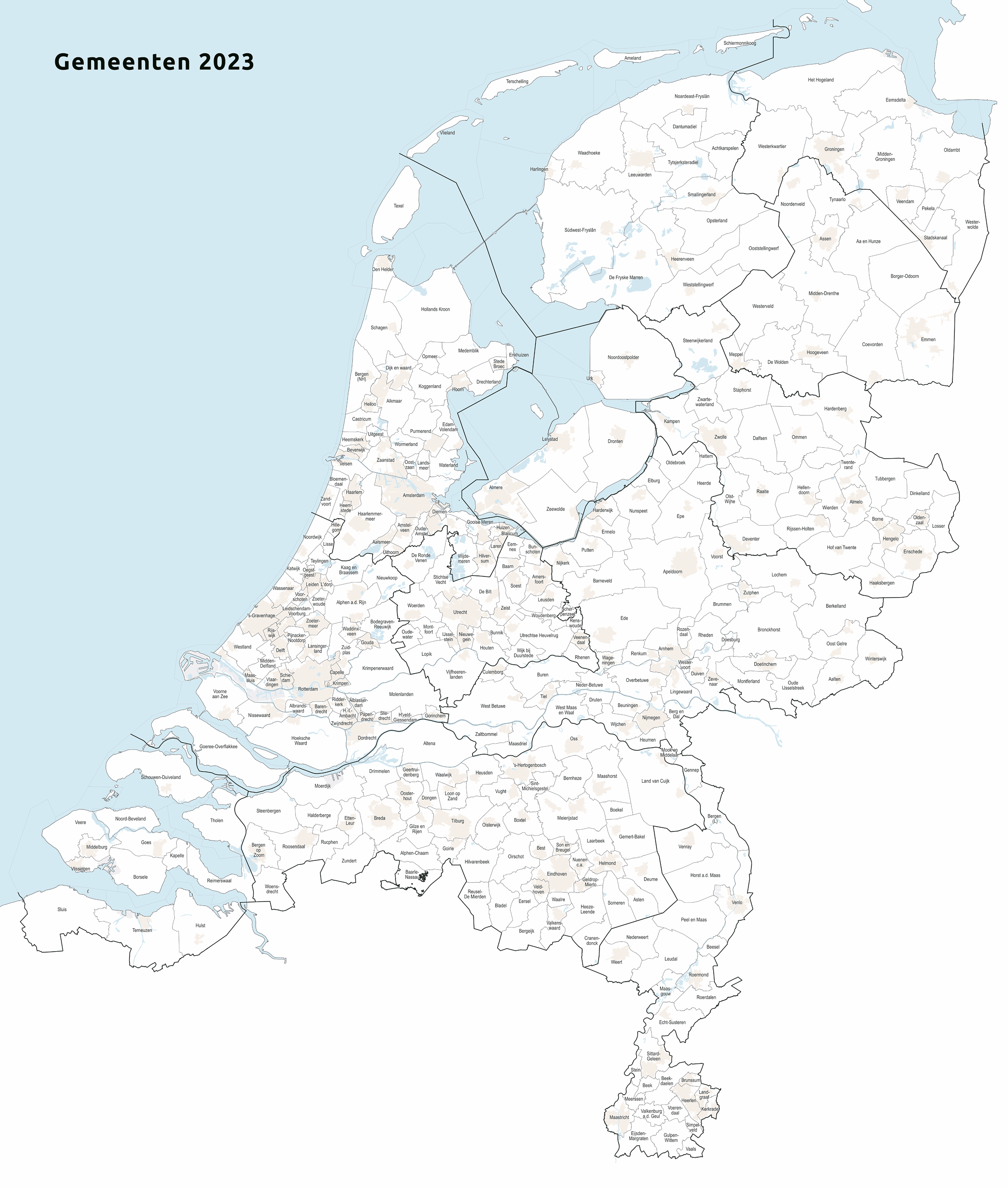
Municipalities of the Netherlands (2023)

Municipal politics in the Netherlands is an important aspect of the politics of the Netherlands. The municipality is the lowest level of government, but this does not reflect the importance that the Amsterdam and Rotterdam governments play in Dutch political life. There are a total of 342 municipalities in the Netherlands.

== Municipal politics ==
In municipal politics there are three functions: the Mayor, the municipal council and the Aldermen. Together they share legislative power. The mayor chairs both the municipal council and the council of mayor and aldermen. The council of mayor and aldermen exercise the executive power of the municipal government. The relationship between the aldermen and the municipal council is officially dualistic. That is, they have separate responsibilities.

Additionally many larger municipalities have Gemeentelijke Rekenkamer (Municipal Chamber of Audit) which oversees the finances of the municipality. Moreover, the two largest municipalities, Amsterdam and Rotterdam, have previously been further divided in boroughs called deelgemeenten.

=== Mayor ===
The mayor (burgemeester) chairs both the council of mayor and aldermen and the municipal council. He is a member of the council of mayor and aldermen and has his own portfolios, often including safety and public order. He also has a representative role, as the head of the municipal government. He is appointed by the national government for a renewable six-year term. When a vacancy occurs the municipal council and King's Commissioner express their preferences to the Minister of the Interior and Kingdom Relations. The Minister generally follows the preferences of the municipal council. Almost all mayors are member of a national political party, but they are expected to exercise their office in a non partisan fashion.

=== Municipal council ===
The municipal council (Dutch: Gemeenteraad, GR) is the elected assembly of the municipality. Its main role is laying down the guidelines for the policy of the council of mayor and aldermen and exercising oversight over the implementation of policy by the council of mayor and aldermen.

The municipal council is elected every four years by the general populace. In many municipalities all major political parties contest in the election in addition to local parties. In most major, urban, municipalities all major parties are represented in the municipal council, while in smaller, rural, municipalities only the largest parties and a local party have seats in the municipal council. All citizens and foreigners who live in the Netherlands for at least four years in a municipality have the right to vote and almost all citizens can be elected, ministers and state secretaries in the national government are barred from standing in elections as well as mayors and civil servants employed by the municipality. The number of members of municipal council depends on the number of inhabitants. After the elections the parties in the states elect the aldermen.

The municipal council is supported by its own civil service headed by the raadsgriffier. Municipal councillors are not paid as full-time politicians: instead most of them have day jobs. Like most legislatures, the members of municipal councils work in both political groups and policy area related committees. The mayor chairs the meetings of the municipal council.

=== Aldermen ===
The Aldermen (Dutch: Wethouders) together with the mayor form the College van Burgemeester and Wethouders (Council of Mayor and Aldermen, B&W). This is the executive council of the municipalities, which implements policy. The members of the Council of Mayor and Aldermen all have their own portfolio on which they prepare, coordinate and plan policy and legislation for the municipal council and implement legislation. The College van B&W have the duty to inform the municipal council on all aspects of their policy. The College van B&W functions a collegial body and most decisions are taken by consensus. An alderman will lose his position if the municipal council adopts a motion of no-confidence against him. Aldermen are elected by the municipal council. They cannot be member of the municipal council, although often aldermen used to be members of the municipal council.

The aldermen can be appointed in two ways. Either as program council (Dutch: programcollege) or a mirror council (Dutch: afspiegelingscolleg). A program council is based on a political program negotiated by a group of parties which has a majority in the municipal council, while a mirror council represents all (major) parties represents in the municipal legislature. Until 1970 all municipalities were mirror municipalities, since then and especially after the dualisation of municipal politics most council of aldermen and mayor have become programmatic. Those executives often include two or more parties with ideological links. The local executive of Rotterdam in the years 2002 until 2006 for example included the Christian Democratic Appeal, the People's Party for Freedom and Democracy and the locally based Livable Rotterdam. The Labour Party, the second largest party of Rotterdam, was kept out of the executive because of ideological conflicts with Leefbaar Rotterdam. The same happened in city of Groningen, where a left wing executive was appointed on 26 April 2006. It consists of the Labour Party, the Socialist Party and GroenLinks.

Some municipal councils allow parties to have dual councillors, politicians who are not elected into the municipal council but are allowed to speak in committees.

=== Dualism ===
In 2002 the municipalities were drastically reformed. Before then all aldermen remained member of the municipal council. The municipal council had all the competences in a municipality and it delegated competences to the council of aldermen and mayor. The council of aldermen and mayor de facto functioned as the executive council of the municipality, but de jure they were little more than a powerful committee.

In 2002 the responsibilities of municipal council and council of aldermen and mayor were clearly delineated and aldermen were barred from being member of the municipal council. The relationship between the B&W and municipal council and is officially dualistic, that is they have separated responsibilities.

== Municipal competences ==
Dutch municipalities do not have a delineated set of competences. In most competences the municipalities have an executive function, executing policy which is made at the national or provincial level. Legally municipalities have an "open household" which means that it can take on any competence it wishes as long as it does not violate national policy or break constitutional bounds. The municipality competences, often shared with national and provincial government include:

- Land management, specifically local zoning laws
- urban development
- transport and local infrastructure
- social affairs, employment and welfare
- economy and the environment
- education

== Finances ==
The municipalities get most of their finances from the national government. Partially through the municipal fund in which the national government puts part of its tax income. This money is divided evenly over the municipalities, which can spend it as they see fit. Moreover, municipalities receive earmarked budgets from the national government, with which the municipality can take care of specific competences such as social security. Municipalities can also levy their own taxes. The most well known is the onroerendzaakbelasting, a tax on home and building ownership. They also tax tourists and people who own dogs. Municipalities also receive administrative payments from citizens who need particular services such as environment permits.
