= De Vos van Steenwijk =

Dutch noble family

de Vos van Steenwijk
- noble family
- Coat of Arms
- Country: Netherlands
- Founded: 14th century
- Founder: Coenraad van den Goere
- Titles: Baron

De Vos van Steenwijk is an old Dutch noble family from the Dutch province of Overijssel.

== History ==
The family was already noble from earliest times ("Uradel"). The first documented ancestor is Coenraad van den Goere who is mentioned in 1318. His son Johan is the first member to carry the De Vos van Steenwijk surname. According to family tradition he was give the name De Vos (the Fox) because of his red hair.

== Notable members ==
- Jan Arend Godert de Vos van Steenwijk, politician.
- Willem Lodewijk de Vos van Steenwijk, politician.

== Gallery ==
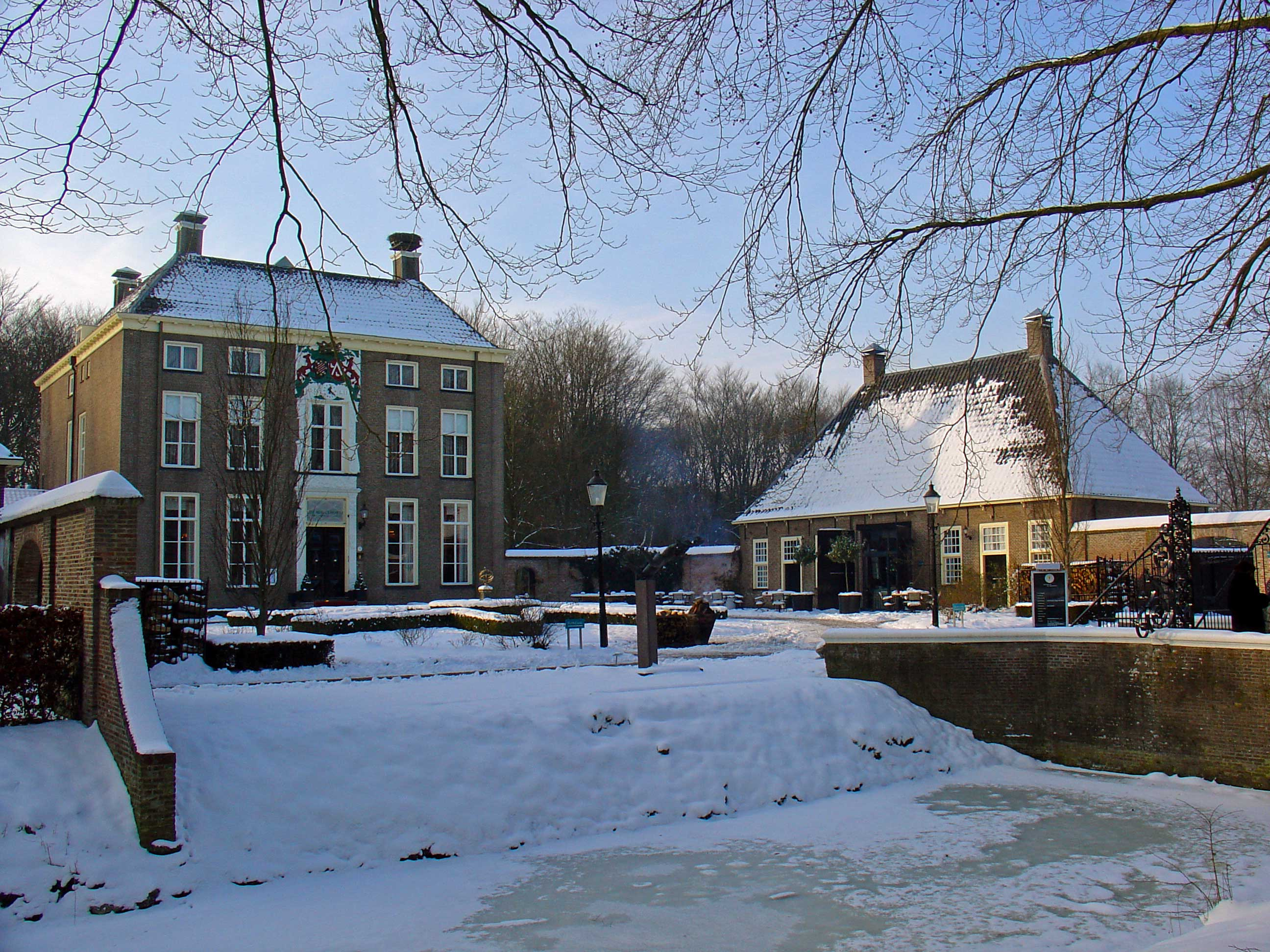
Havixhorst estate, property of the family in the 17th century.

Coat of arms (1814)

== Literature ==
- A.N. de Vos van Steenwijk, Het geslacht de Vos van Steenwijk in het licht van de geschiedenis van de Drentse Adel, uitg. Van Gorcum, Assen, 1976 ISBN 90-232-1273-8
- J.A. de Vos van Steenwijk, Het wapen van De Vos van Steenwijk en eenige mededeelingen betreffende enkele personen, behoord hebbende tot de eerste generatieën van dit geslacht, Voorstonden, 1908
- Nederland's Adelsboek 97 (2012), p. 1-66.
