= Arthur van Dijk =

Dutch politician (born 1963)

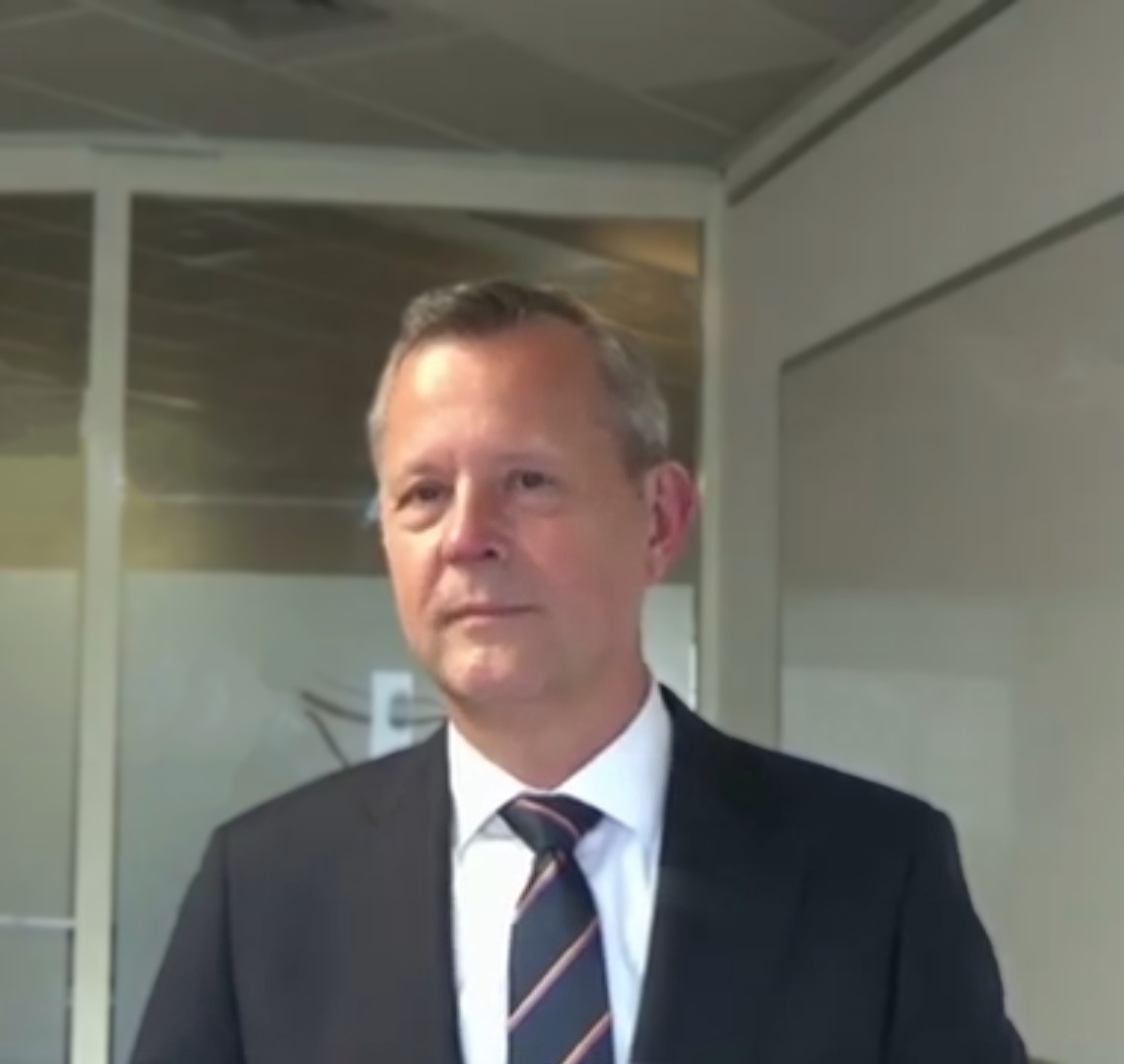
- Van Dijk in 2021

King's Commissioner of North Holland
- Incumbent
- Assumed office 1 January 2019
- Monarch: Willem-Alexander
- Preceded by: Johan Remkes

Personal details
- Born: 3 February 1963 (age 63) Dordrecht, Netherlands
- Party: People's Party for Freedom and Democracy
- Education: Leiden University
- Occupation: Politician

Arthur van Dijk (born 3 February 1963) is a Dutch politician who has served as the King's Commissioner of North Holland since 2019. He is a member of the People's Party for Freedom and Democracy (VVD).

== Career ==
Dijk attended Leiden University, where he studied tax law. He worked many jobs at the ministries of Finance and Justice. Later, he was an alderman in Haarlemmermeer.
