= King's commissioner =

Head of a province in the Netherlands

Clickable image of provinces of the Netherlands

A King's commissioner (Dutch: Commissaris van de Koning, CvdK) is the head of government and legislature in a province of the Netherlands. When the reigning monarch is a woman, the title is Queen's commissioner (Commissaris van de Koningin). The commissioner serves as the non-voting chair of the provincial council and as voting chair of the provincial executive.

Officially, a commissioner is appointed by the Dutch monarch. In practice, provincial commissioners are appointed by the council of ministers at the advice of the minister of the interior. The commissioner serves with the pleasure and confidence of the central government, and may consequently be withdrawn at any time. In practice, this is rare, occurring only in cases of gross mismanagement or criminal offenses.

== Background ==
The government of the Netherlands consist of the national institutions, the twelve provinces and the 342 municipalities. The three tiers are largely organised in the same way, with a directly elected legislature, which in turn elects the executive branch, that is headed by a chairperson appointed by the Dutch monarch and the Dutch crown respectively.

The provinces form the regional administration, between the national and municipal levels. They are responsible for issues such as spatial planning and health care, within the bounds prescribed by the national government. The provinces also oversee policy and finances of municipalities and other lesser authorities such as water boards.

The provincial legislature, called the States-Provincial or Provincial Council, are elected by direct popular vote every four years. The executive authority is exercised collectively by the College of the King's Commissioner and the Provincial executive. The latter is elected by, and are accountable to, the provincial council.

== Appointment ==
The King's commissioner is appointed by the Dutch Crown, meaning the Council of Ministers of the Kingdom of the Netherlands, for a term of six years, renewable. An appointed commissioner can be dismissed only by the Crown.

When a vacancy arises, the States Provincial express their preferences to the Minister of the Interior and Kingdom Relations, who, in turn, presents a candidate for appointment by the Council of Ministers.

The candidates are almost exclusively drawn from among prominent members of the major national political parties, but are expected to be politically impartial while exercising their office.

== Responsibilities ==
- Head of provincial government, and highest representative of the province
- official representative of the central government to the province
- non-voting, impartial chair of the States-Provincial
- oversight of the provincial administration and provincial utilities
- chair and full, voting member of the Provincial council, with the possibility of holding their own political portfolio; common responsibilities include safety and public order
- coordinator of public disaster management and prevention
- part of the province's oversight of municipal policy and finances, by paying regular official visits to the municipalities of the provinces
- upon a vacancy as mayor (burgemeester) in a municipality of the province, reception of the municipal council's expressed preferences of candidate, and, based on that expression, recommending a candidate to the Minister of the Interior and Kingdom Relations

== Naming practice in Limburg ==
In the Dutch province of Limburg, the King's Commissioner is informally referred to as Governor (Dutch: Gouverneur), drawing on the corresponding office in the bordering Belgian province of Limburg. Accordingly, the Province Hall (Provinciehuis) at Maastricht is thus often referred to as the Governor's Residence (Gouvernement).

This local custom arose from the particular status of the province in the nineteenth century. The official name of the office, however, is the King's Commissioner just as in the other Dutch provinces.

== List of current King's commissioners ==
Province	King's commissioner		Party	Serving since	Previous office
Drenthe	Agnes Mulder	Agnes Mulder (born 1973)	Christian; Democratic Appeal	1 December 2025 (114 days)	Member of the House of Representatives
Flevoland	Arjen Gerritsen	Arjen Gerritsen (born 1970)	People's Party for Freedom and Democracy	1 November 2023 (2 years, 144 days)	Mayor of Almelo
Friesland	Arno Brok	Arno Brok (born 1968)	People's Party for Freedom and Democracy	1 March 2017 (9 years, 24 days)	Mayor of Dordrecht
Gelderland	Daniël Wigboldus	Daniël Wigboldus (born 1969)	Independent	19 March 2025 (1 year, 6 days)	Professor of Social psychology Radboud University Nijmegen
Groningen		René Paas (born 1966)	Christian; Democratic Appeal	18 April 2016 (9 years, 341 days)	Member of the Social and Economic Council
Limburg	Emile Roemer	Emile Roemer (born 1962)	Socialist Party	1 December 2021 (4 years, 114 days)	Acting; Mayor of Alkmaar
North Brabant	Ina Adema	Ina Adema (born 1968)	People's Party for Freedom and Democracy	1 October 2020 (5 years, 175 days)	Mayor of Lelystad
North Holland	Arthur van Dijk	Arthur van Dijk (born 1963)	People's Party for Freedom and Democracy	1 January 2019 (7 years, 83 days)	Member of the Social and Economic Council
Overijssel	Andries Heidema	Andries Heidema (born 1962)	Christian Union	11 July 2018 (7 years, 257 days)	Mayor of Deventer
South Holland	Wouter Kolff	Wouter Kolff (born 1976)	People's Party for Freedom and Democracy	1 September 2024 (1 year, 205 days)	Mayor of Dordrecht
Utrecht		Hans Oosters (born 1962)	Labour Party	1 February 2019 (7 years, 52 days)	Dijkgraaf
Zeeland	Hugo de Jonge	Hugo de Jonge (born 1977)	Christian; Democratic Appeal	15 September 2024 (1 year, 191 days); Acting	Minister of the Interior and Kingdom Relations

== See also ==
- Category:Lists of King's and Queen's commissioners in the Netherlands
- Lord-lieutenant
