= Mark-Vlietkanaal =

Navigable canal in North Brabant

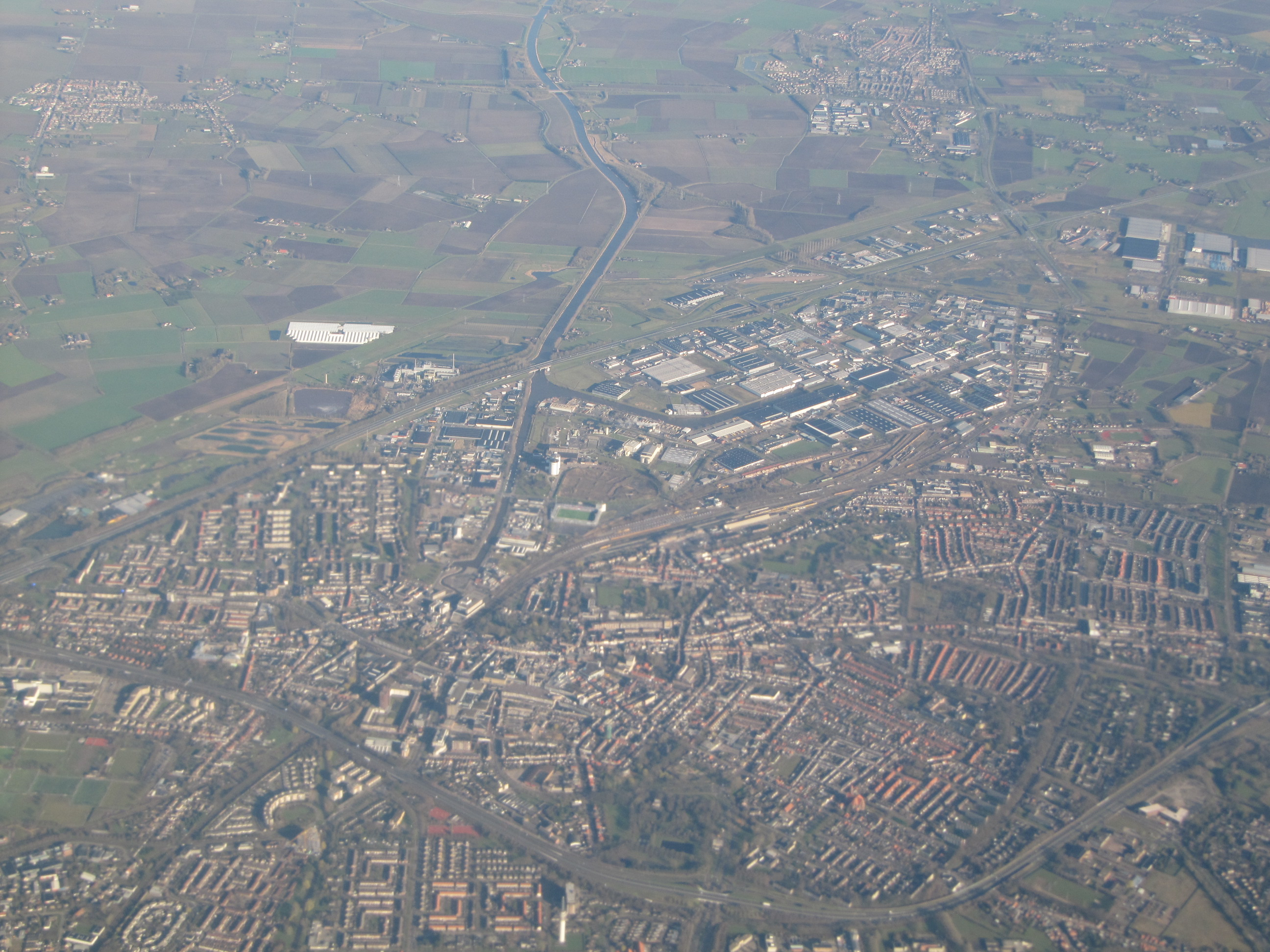
- Interactive map of Mark-Vlietkanaal

History
- Construction began: 1983

Geography
- Start point: Mark (Dintel)
- End point: Steenbergse Vliet

The Mark-Vlietkanaal is a navigable canal in North Brabant.

The canal connects west from the river Mark (Dintel) to Stampersgat starting at the point Dintel, transitioning from the Steenbergse Vliet to the Roosendaalse Vliet. The final section is navigable up to and including the industrial areas north and west of Roosendaal, where it has two ramifications.

The canal can be accessed by sailing from Roosendaal to the Volkerak and to the city Breda. The Breda and Rosendaal rowing clubs organize a regatta via this route every year.

The canal was dug in 1983. It, in fact, followed an old route from the Roosendaalse Vliet. West of Oud Gastel, the Roosendaalse flows to the west and enters the canal in an almost straight line to the north, culminating about four kilometers west from Stamptersgat in the Mark.
