= Breda International Airport =

Regional airport in the province of North Brabant, Netherlands

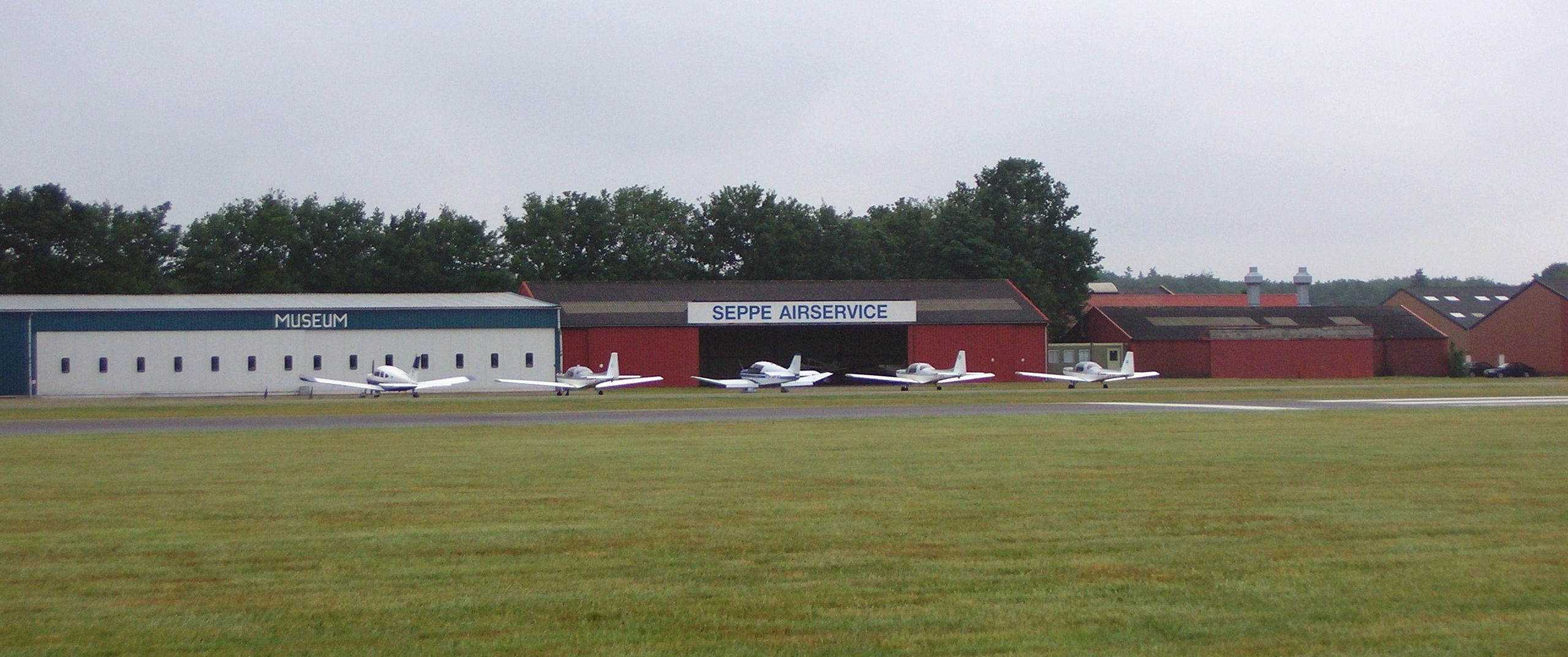
- IATA: none; ICAO: EHSE

Summary
- Airport type: Public
- Operator: N.V. Vliegveld Seppe
- Serves: Hoeven, Breda, Roosendaal
- Location: Bosschenhoofd (Seppe)
- Elevation AMSL: 30 ft / 9 m
- Coordinates: 51°33′17″N 004°33′09″E
- Website: www.breda-airport.eu
- Interactive map of Breda International Airport

Runways
Direction	Length		Surface
Direction	m	ft	Surface
06/24	830	2,723	Asphalt
- Source: AIP from AIS the Netherlands

Breda International Airport, until 2015 Seppe Airfield, (ICAO: EHSE) is a small general aviation aerodrome located next to the A58 motorway on the outskirts of Bosschenhoofd, a village in the municipality of Halderberge in the province of North Brabant in the Netherlands. It is located 2 NM (3.7 km; 2.3 mi) southwest of Hoeven, 7.5 NM (13.9 km; 8.6 mi) west from Breda and 4 NM (7.4 km; 4.6 mi) east-northeast of Roosendaal.

The airport has a single asphalt runway, 06/24 (previously 07/25), with a length of 830 m (2,723 ft) and a significantly displaced threshold (meaning an area at the beginning of the runway that is not to be used for landing) on either side.

Originally called Seppe Airfield, the airport started in 1949 as a glider field and has been used by powered aircraft since 1961. In 2002, the grass runway surface was replaced with asphalt. Around 50,000 airplane movements (take-offs or landings) are made at Seppe annually. In February 2014, it was announced that the name of the airport would be changed to Breda International Airport. The airport was officially renamed on 1 January 2015. Its ICAO designation remained "Seppe".

The airfield is also home to a small flying museum, Vliegend Museum Seppe (The Flying Museum of Seppe), displaying various aircraft, most of which are still airworthy, including de Havilland Tiger Moths, a Boeing Stearman.
