= Oud- en Nieuw-Gastel =

Previous Dutch municipality

Coordinates: 51.584217°N 4.465256°E

Coat of Arms

Oud- en Nieuw-Gastel was a municipality in the Dutch province of North Brabant. It covered the villages of Oud Gastel, located 7 km north of Roosendaal, and Stampersgat.

The municipality existed until 1997, when it became part of the new municipality of Halderberge.
