= Gabriel Nuchelmans =

Dutch philosopher (1922-1996)

Gabriel Nuchelmans (15 May 1922, Oud Gastel – 6 August 1996, Wassenaar) was a Dutch philosopher, who focused on the history of philosophy as well as on logic and the philosophy of language more in particular.

== Biography ==
After completing high school at the Episcopal School of Roermond, Nuchelmans studied at the Catholic University of Nijmegen, where he also earned his PhD in 1950. While studying for his PhD, he spent a year in Freiburg, Switzerland with Olof Gigon and Joseph Maria Bocheński. In 1947 and 1948 he attended courses by Alfred Ayer and Stuart Hampshire, at University College London. He also heard, at the London School of Economics, Karl Popper and J. O. Wisdom.

After earning his PhD, Nuchelmans taught for fourteen years Latin and Greek in Velsen. From 1964, he taught Ancient Philosophy and Analytic Philosophy and its History at the Philosophical Institute of the University of Leiden until his retirement on 10 September 1987. On this occasion, a volume of essays (Logos and Pragma) was dedicated to him to celebrate his scholarly achievements. Nuchelmans had since 1975 been a member of the Koninklijke Nederlandse Akademie van Wetenschappen. His great work in three volumes on the history of the theories of proposition (1973, 1980, 1983) will remain for a long time the standard work on the subject.

Nuchelmans also wrote several more introductory books, including a work on David Hume (1965) and a survey of the history of analytical philosophy (1969).

== Selected publications ==
- Theories of the Proposition. Ancient and Medieval Conceptions of the Bearers of Truth and Falsity, North-Holland, Amsterdam/London 1973, ISBN 0-7204-6188-X
- Late-Scholastic and Humanist Theories of the Proposition, North-Holland, Amsterdam/London 1980, ISBN 978-0-7204-8468-7
- Judgement and proposition. From Descartes to Kant, North-Holland, Amsterdam/London 1983, ISBN 0-444-85571-8
- Geulincx Containment Theory of Logic, (Mededelingen Der Koninklijke Nederlandse Akademie Van Wetenschappen, Afd. Letterkunde), Royal Netherlands Academy of Arts & Sciences 1988, ISBN 978-0-444-85698-2
- Dilemmatic Arguments. Towards a History of Their Logic and Rhetoric, North-Holland, Amsterdam/London 1991, ISBN 0-444-85730-3
- Secundum/Tertium Adiacens Vicissitudes of a Logical Distinction, (Mededelingen Der Koninklijke Nederlandse Akademie Van Wetenschappen, Afd. Letterkunde), Royal Netherlands Academy of Arts & Sciences 1992, ISBN 978-0-444-85762-0
- Studies in the History of Logic and Semantics, 12th – 17th Century, edited durch E.P. Bos, Variorum, Aldershot 1996 (reprint of 17 essays) (online)
- Logic in the Seventeenth Century. Preliminary Remarks and the Constituents of the Proposition, The Cambridge History of Seventeenth-century Philosophy. Edited by Daniel Garber and Michael R. Ayers. Cambridge: Cambridge University Press 1998. pp. 103–117
- Proposition and Judgement, The Cambridge History of Seventeenth-century Philosophy. Edited by Daniel Garber and Michael R. Ayers. Cambridge: Cambridge University Press 1998. pp. 118–131
- Deductive Reasoning, The Cambridge History of Seventeenth-century Philosophy. Edited by Daniel Garber and Michael R. Ayers. Cambridge: Cambridge University Press 1998. pp. 132–146

== Sources ==
- L. M. de Rijk, H. A. G. Braakhuis (eds.): Logos and Pragma. Essays on the Philosophy of Language in Honour of Professor Gabriel Nuchelmans Nijmegen, Ingenium Publishers, 1987 (with a bibliography of his works (1950–1987)
- L. M. de Rijk, Biography (in Dutch)
