= Bosschenhoofd =

- Village
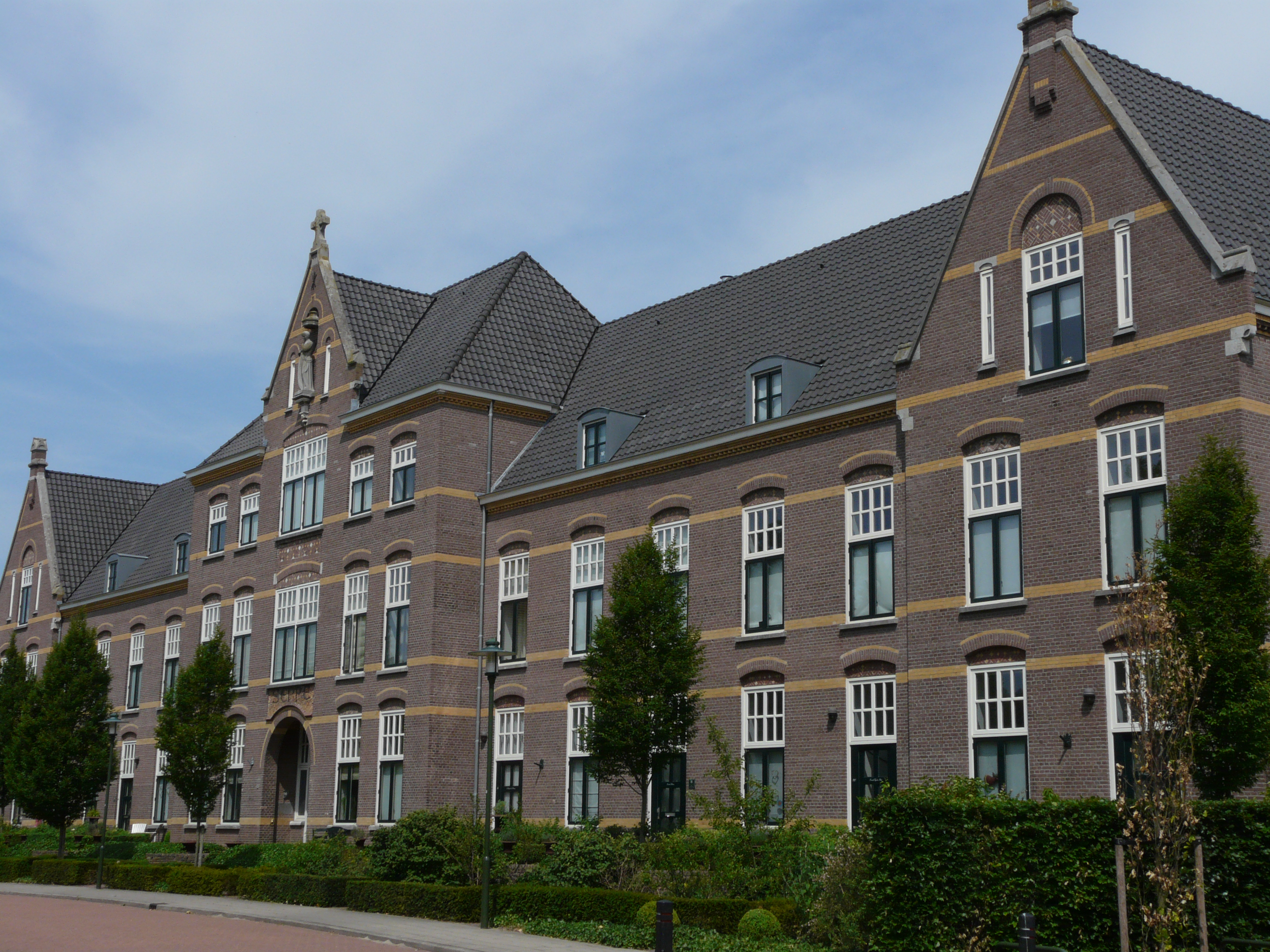
- Retirement home Seppe

- Location on a map of North Brabant province Bosschenhoofd (Netherlands)
- Coordinates: 51°33′38″N 04°32′29″E
- Country: Netherlands
- Province: North Brabant
- Municipality: Halderberge

Area
  - Total: 5.13 km^{2} (1.98 sq mi)
- Elevation: 10 m (33 ft)

Population (2021)
  - Total: 2,555
  - Density: 498/km^{2} (1,290/sq mi)
- Time zone: UTC+1 (CET)
  - Summer (DST): UTC+2 (CEST)
- Postal code: 4744
- Dialing code: 0165

Bosschenhoofd is a village in the municipality of Halderberge in the province of North Brabant in the Netherlands. The village is also known as Seppe, a name used by the nearby Seppe Airport. Seppe was derived from Jacobus Sep who ran an inn. Before the municipal reorganization of 1997, Bosschenhoofd belonged to the municipality of Hoeven.

== History ==
The village was first mentioned in 1740 as Bossenhooft, and means "destination (of the peat ships) of Oudenbosch". Bosschenhoofd started during the peat excavation of the area, and became the replacement harbour for Oudenbosch after 1621. The village developed as a linear settlement in the 19th century.

Bosschenhoofd was home to 269 people in 1840. The Seppe railway station was built in 1854 on the Roosendaal to Breda railway line. It was closed in 1940. The building is nowadays used as a flower shop. The Catholic Sacred Heart of Jesus Church was built in 1928. It was severely damaged during World War II, and rebuilt in 1946. Seppe Airport was built in 1949. In 2008, it was privatised and has been renamed Breda International Airport. In 1975, the village was officially named Bosschenhoofd.

== Gallery ==
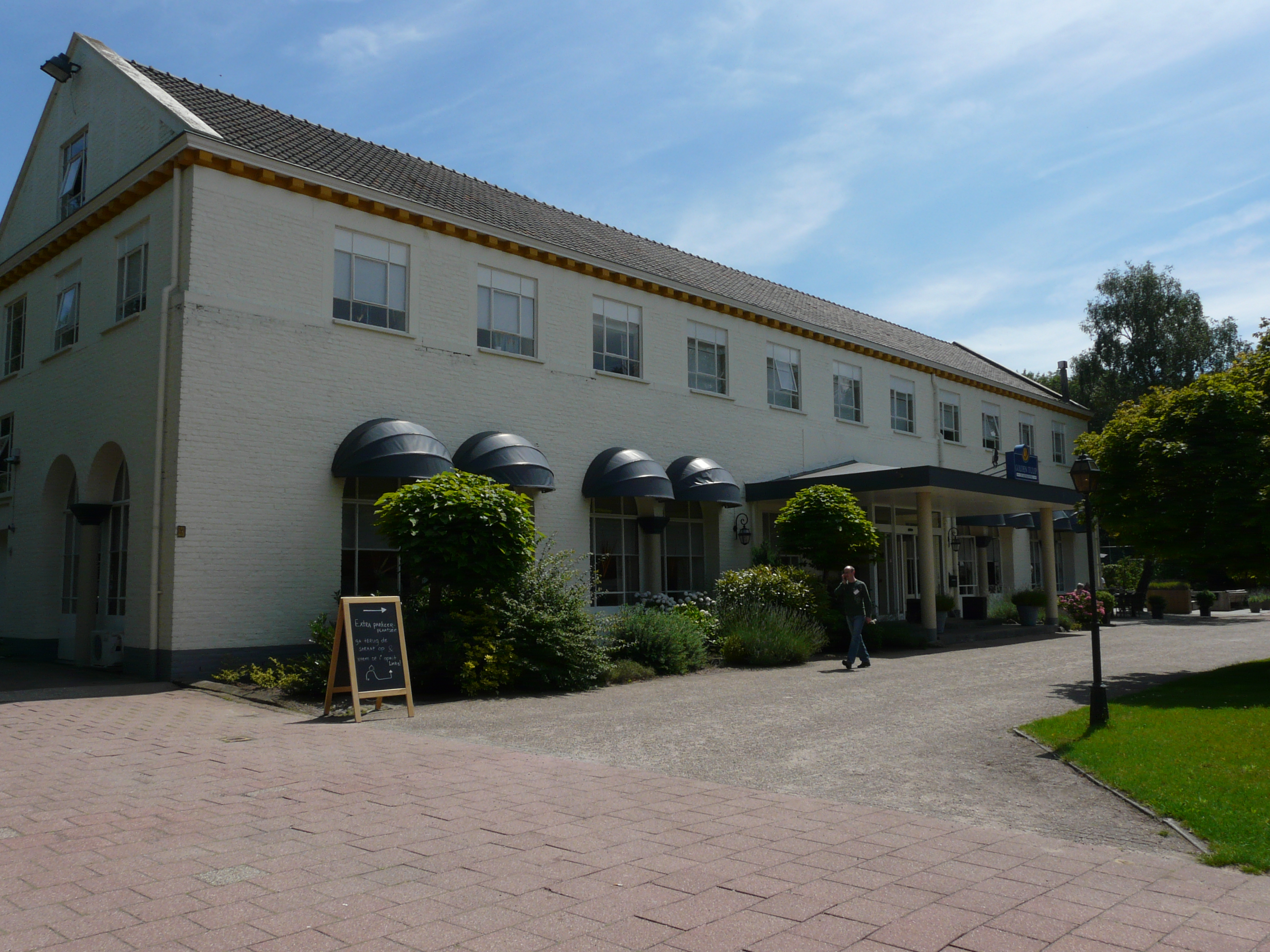
Hotel in Bosschenhoofd

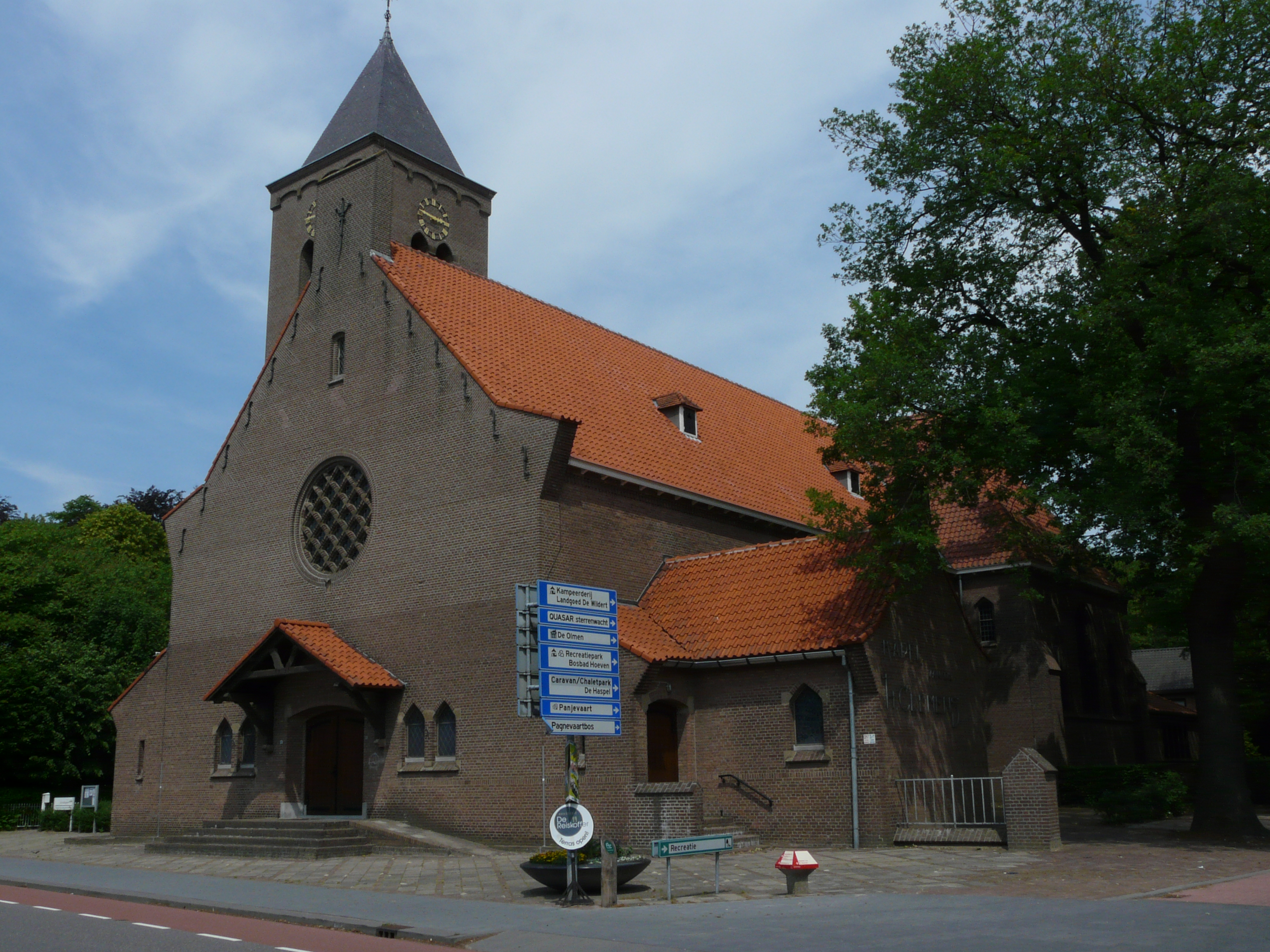
Sacred Heart of Jesus Church

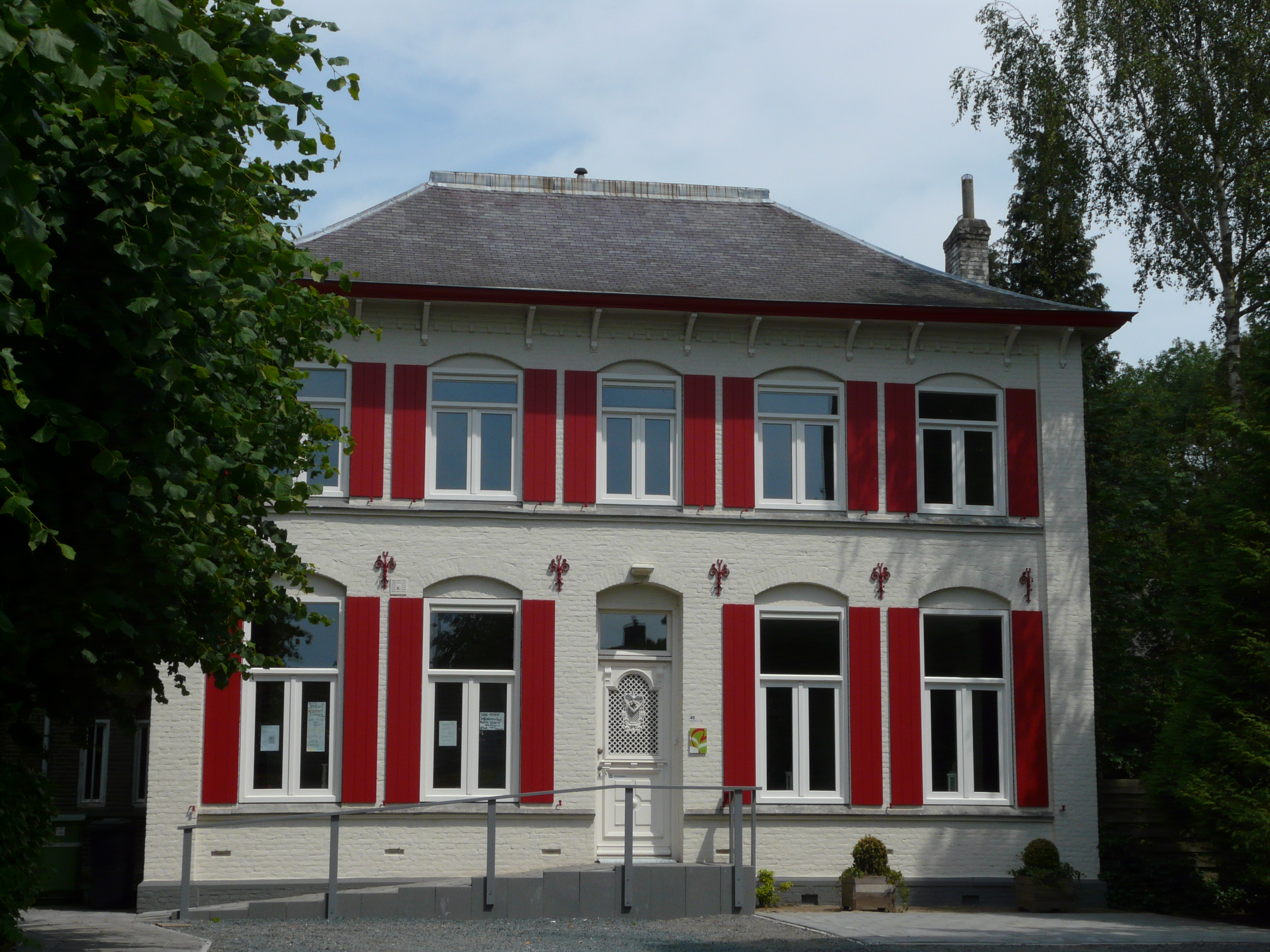
Villa in Bosschenhoofd

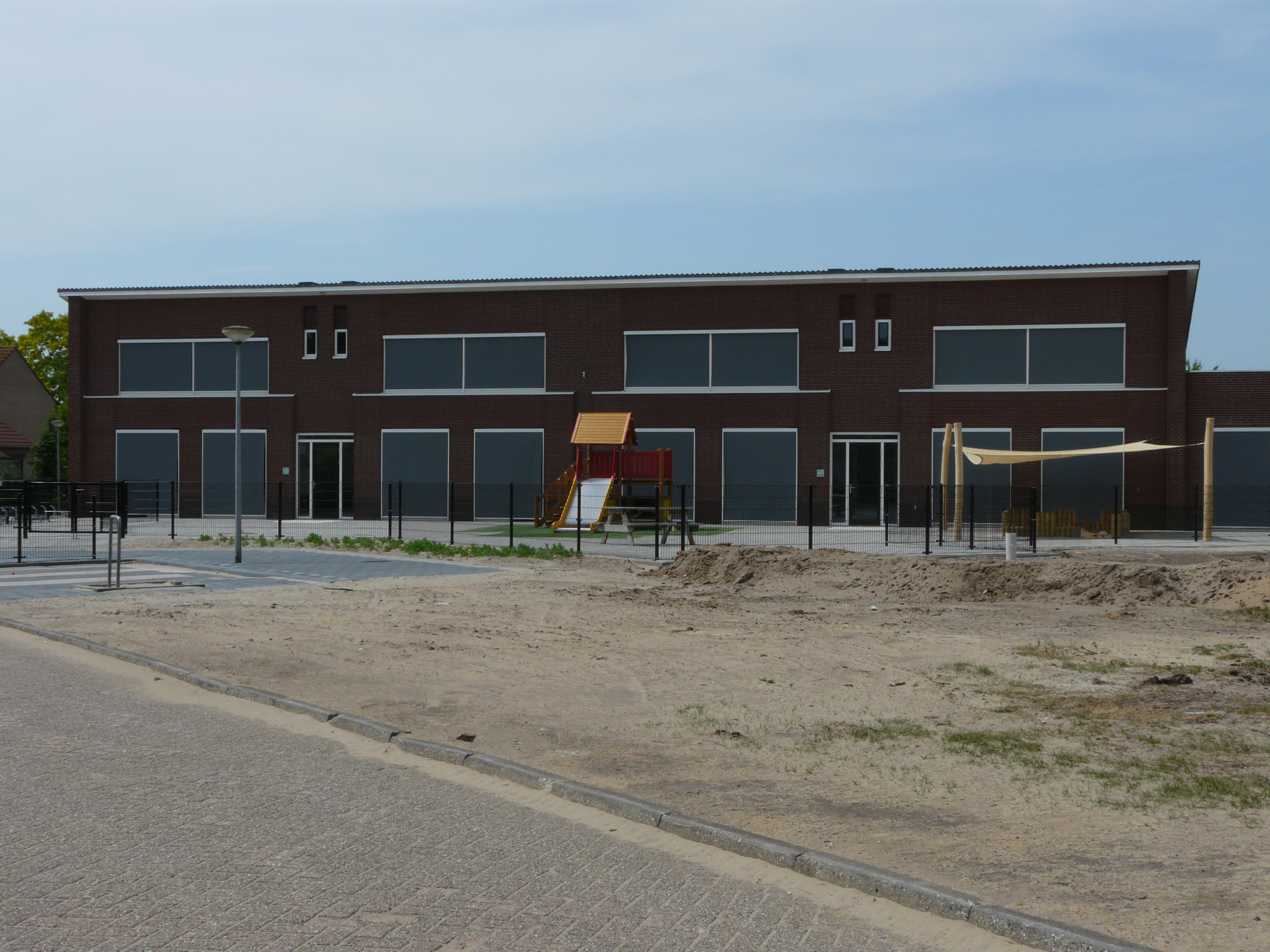
School
