= Stampersgat =

- Village
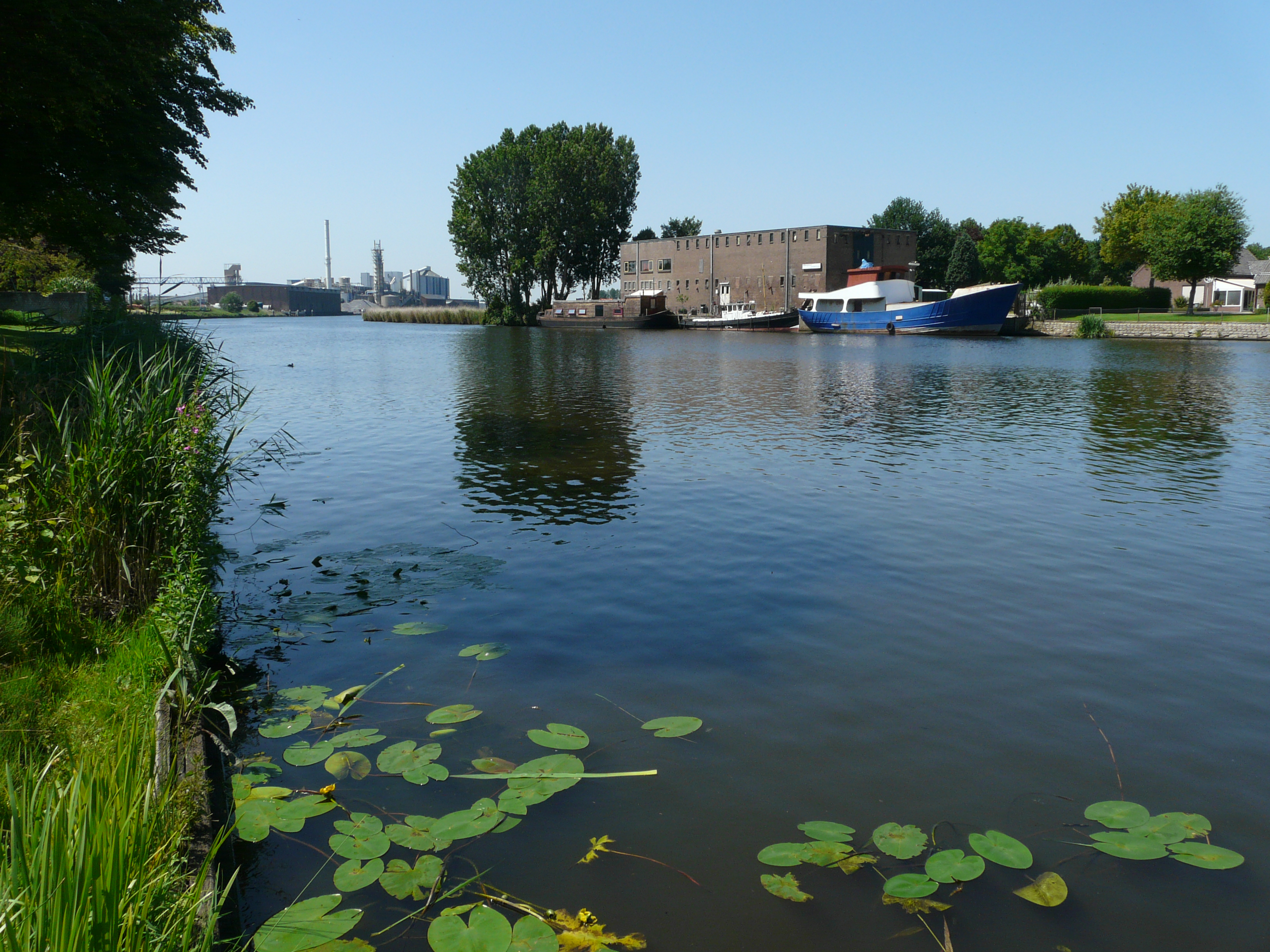

- Location in the province of North Brabant in the Netherlands Stampersgat (Netherlands)
- Coordinates: 51°36′46″N 4°26′22″E
- Country: Netherlands
- Province: North Brabant
- Municipality: Halderberge

Area
  - Total: 4.76 km^{2} (1.84 sq mi)
- Elevation: 2.3 m (7.5 ft)

Population (2021)
  - Total: 1,210
  - Density: 254/km^{2} (658/sq mi)
- Time zone: UTC+1 (CET)
  - Summer (DST): UTC+2 (CEST)
- Postal code: 4754
- Dialing code: 0165

Stampersgat is a village situated in the municipality of Halderberge, in the north-west of the North Brabant province in the Netherlands.

The village was first mentioned in 1639 as Stoutersgat, and means "mouth of the creek of the family Stamper". Stampersgat is dike village which developed on the Dintel in the 15th century. In 1899, a church was built which was replaced in 1924.

Stampersgat was home to 134 people in 1840. The village was completely destroyed in 1944. The village used to be part of the municipality of Oud en Nieuw Gastel. In 1993, the Province of North Brabant suggested a merger into Steenbergen. The inhabitants of Stampersgat protested the decision and wanted to merge with Oudenbosch. A majority voted for Oudenbosch in a referendum. In 1997, it was merged into Halderberge, the new name for the municipality of Oudenbosch.

== Gallery ==
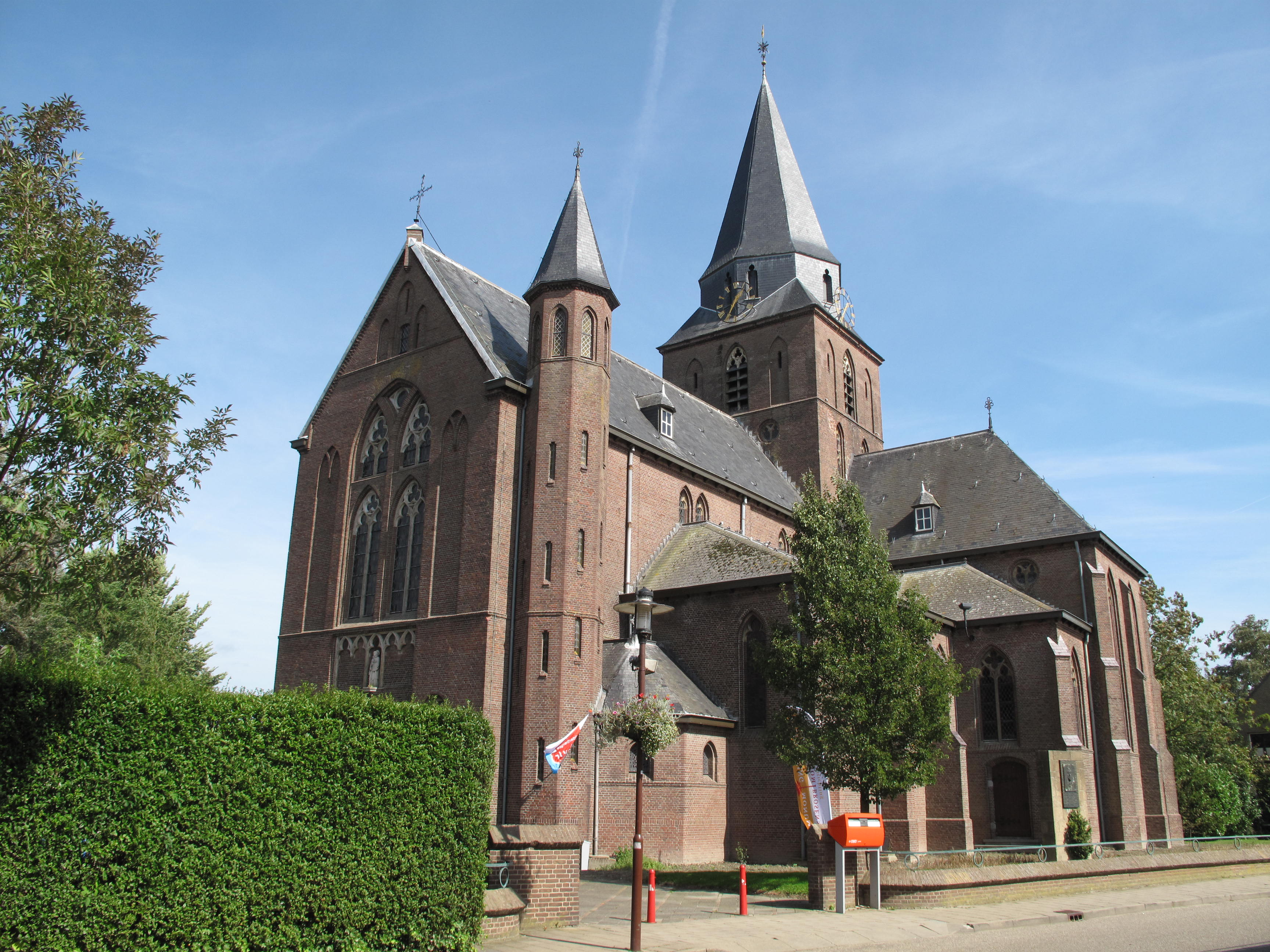
Stampersgat, church

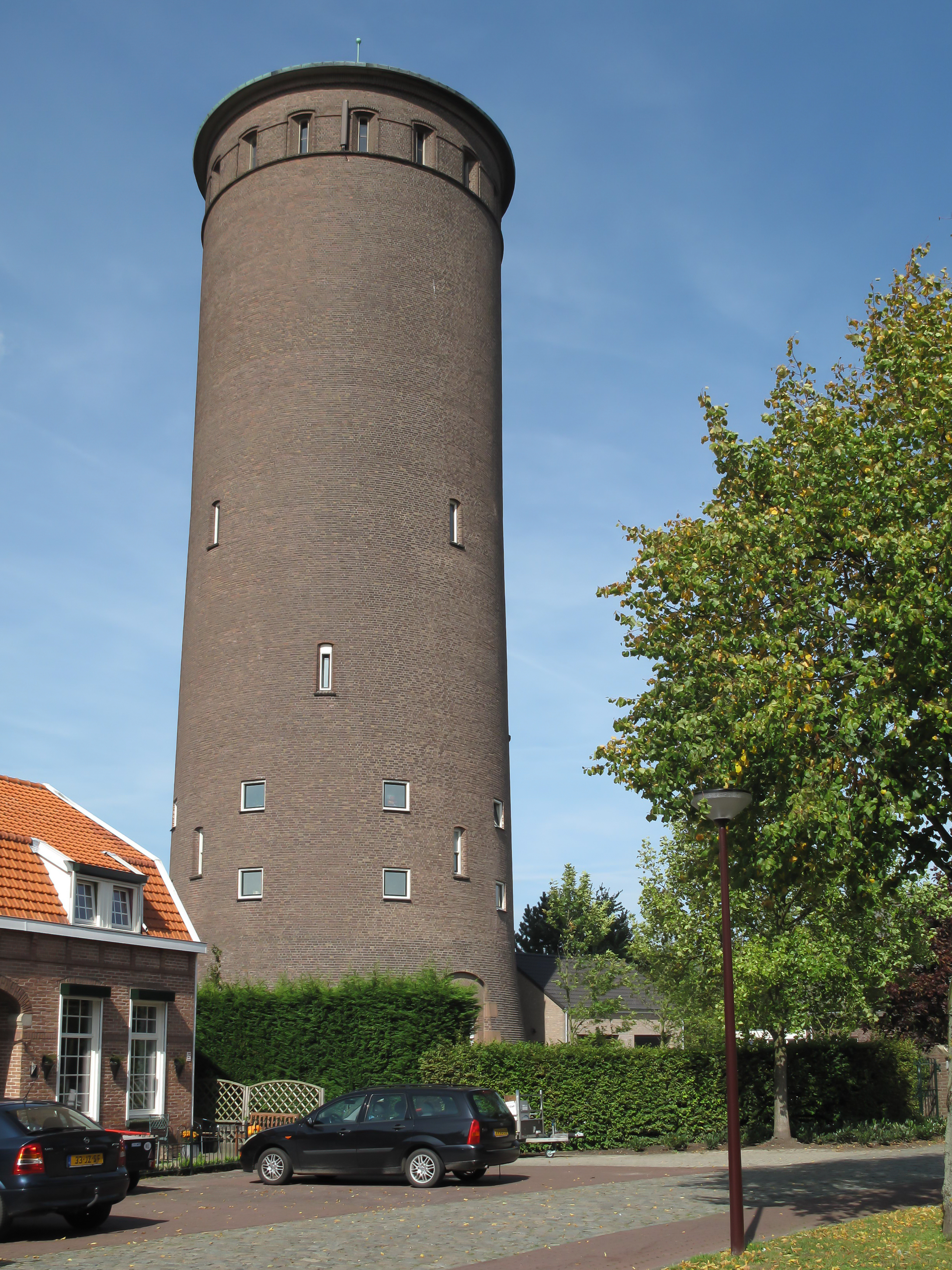
Stampersgat, water tower

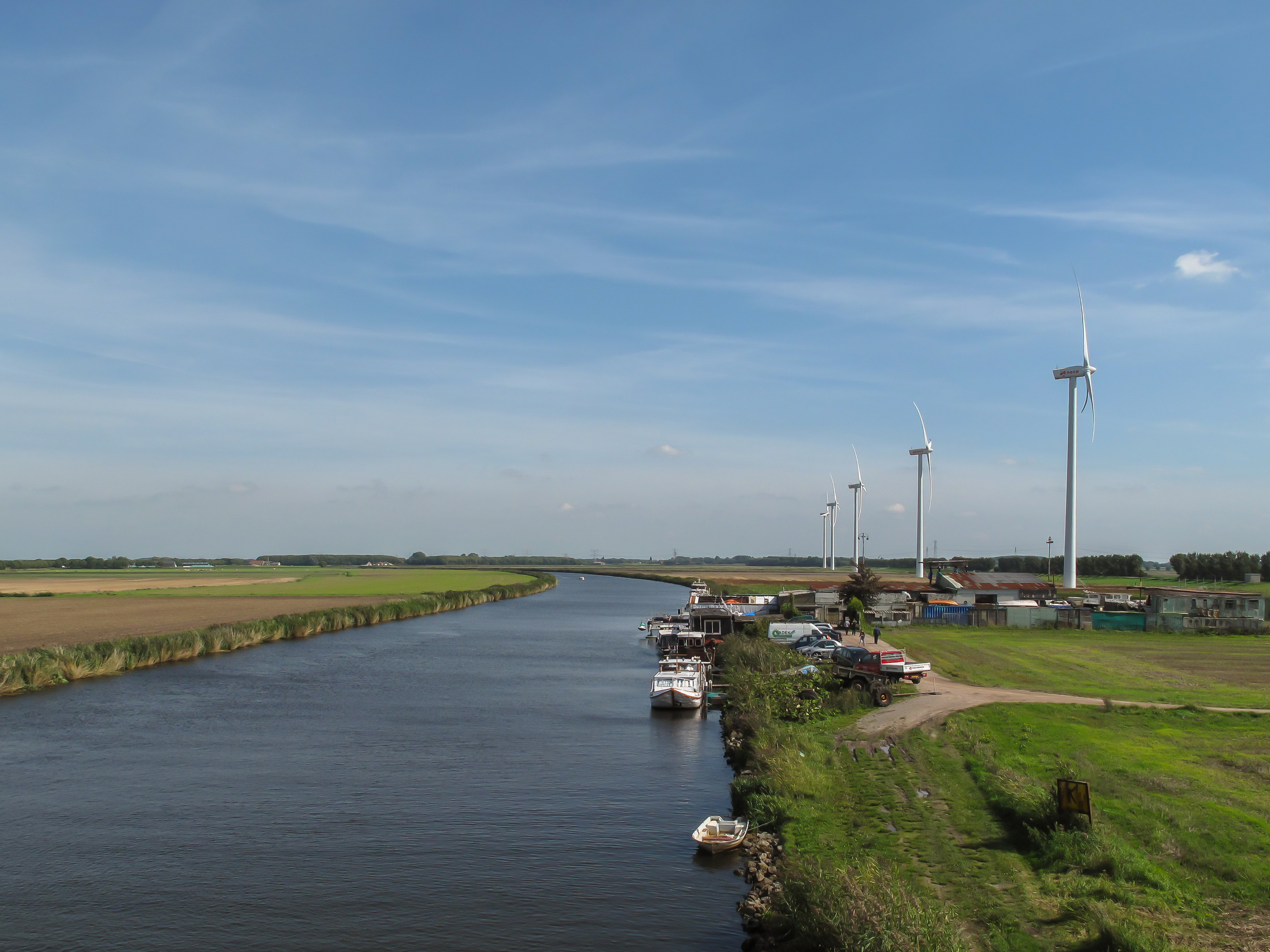
Stampersgat, river: de Mark
