= Henk Braakhuis =

Dutch historian of philosophy

Henricus Antonius Giovanni "Henk" Braakhuis (born 1939) is a Dutch historian of philosophy. He was a professor of history of medieval philosophy at the Radboud University Nijmegen.

His 1979 dissertation was titled: "Syncategoremata". Braakhuis was elected a member of the Royal Netherlands Academy of Arts and Sciences in 1990. In 2002 Braakhuis became interim director of the Constantijn Huygens Institute.
