= Steenbergse Vliet =

Coordinates: 51.6313°N 4.2535°E

The Steenbergse Vliet is a small river in North Brabant, the Netherlands. It rises near Steenbergen and flows into the Volkerak, which is part of the Rhine–Meuse–Scheldt delta. The surrounding area is a nature reserve consisting mainly of reed marshes. The river is connected to the Volkerak through the lock complex at Benedensas, following the reopening of the locks. The area provides an important habitat for waterbirds and serves as a spawning ground for fish, including carp and zander. Since the 1990s, the Steenbergse Vliet has also developed into a popular destination for water recreation.
