= Oud Gastel =

Village in North Brabant, Netherlands

- Village
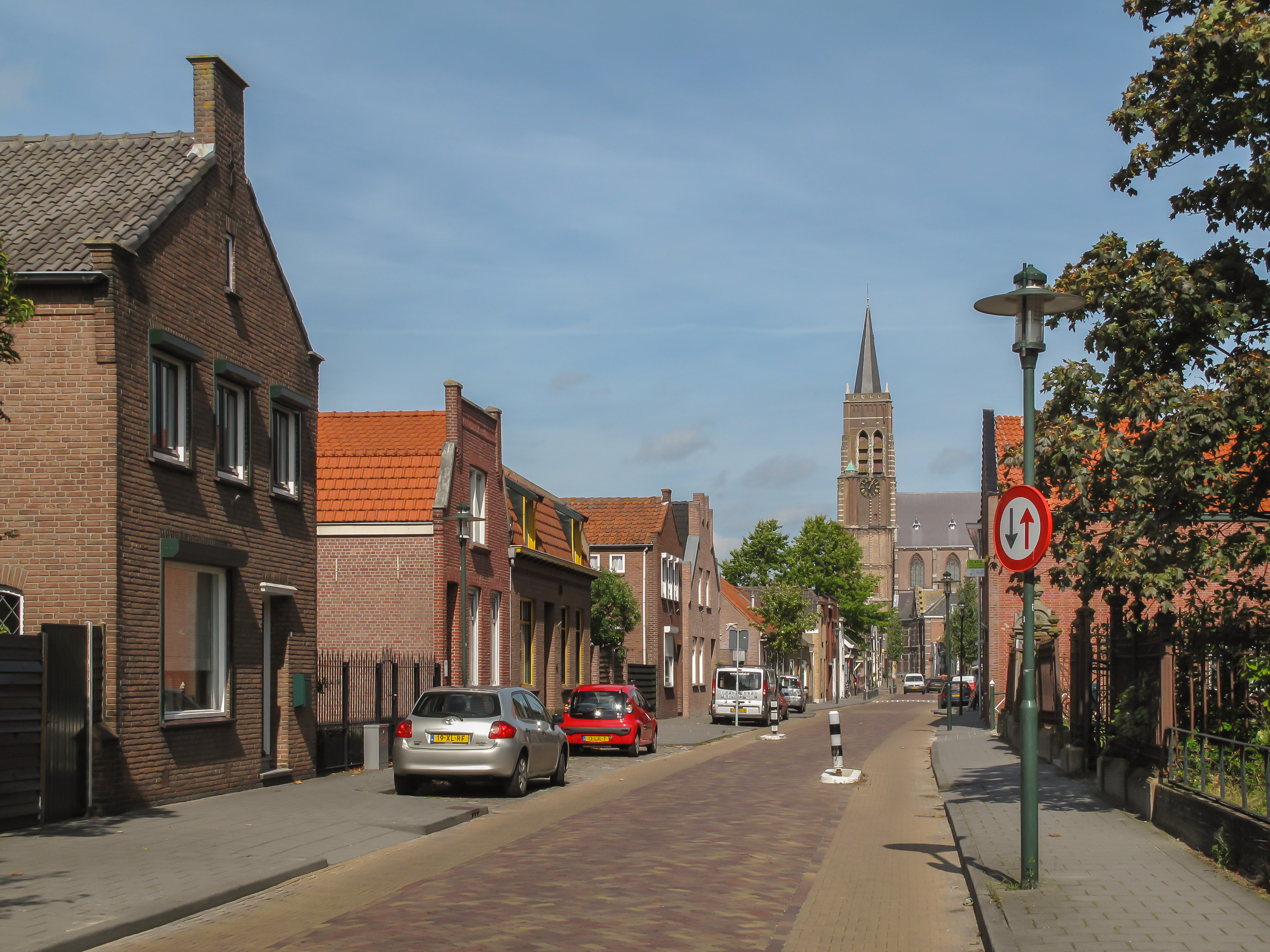
- Street view

- Location in the province of North Brabant in the Netherlands Oud Gastel (Netherlands)
- Coordinates: 51°35′11″N 4°27′28″E
- Country: Netherlands
- Province: North Brabant
- Municipality: Halderberge

Area
  - Total: 18.08 km^{2} (6.98 sq mi)
- Elevation: 1.9 m (6.2 ft)

Population (2021)
  - Total: 6,615
  - Density: 365.9/km^{2} (947.6/sq mi)
- Time zone: UTC+1 (CET)
  - Summer (DST): UTC+2 (CEST)
- Postal code: 4751
- Dialing code: 0165

Oud Gastel is a village situated in the municipality of Halderberge, in the north-west of the North Brabant province in the Netherlands.

The village was first mentioned in 1278 as Gestele, and means "guest house". Oud (old) has been added to distinguish from the former village Nieuw Gastel. Oud Gastel is a stretched out settlement which developed in the Late Middle Ages.

The Catholic St Laurentius Church was built in 1906 to replace its predecessor. The tower of the old church remained and dates from 1483. The tower was restored between 1952 and 1959.

Oud Gastel was home to 581 people in 1840. Prior to 1997, the village was part of the Oud- en Nieuw-Gastel municipality.

== Gallery ==
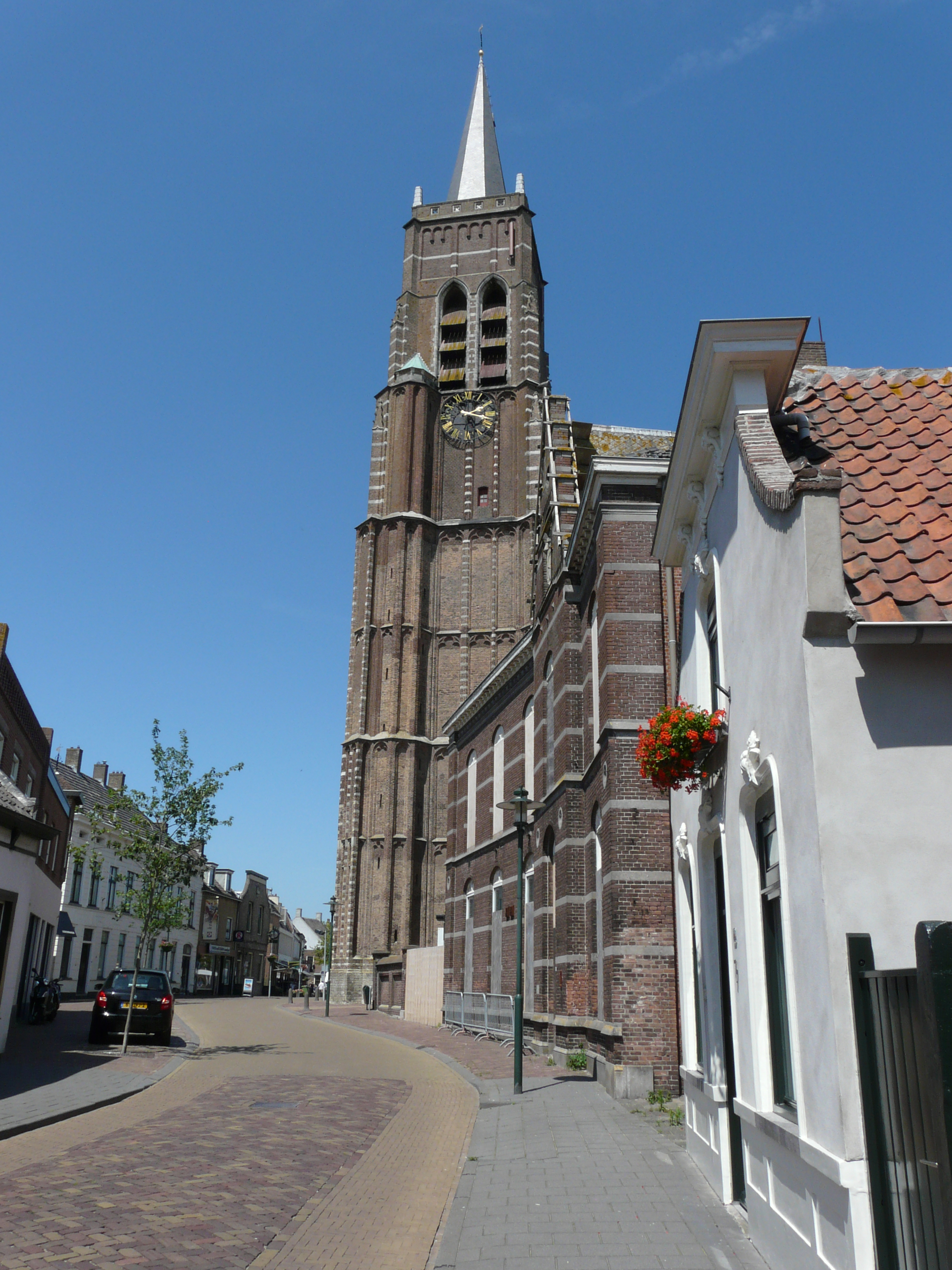
Saint Laurentius church

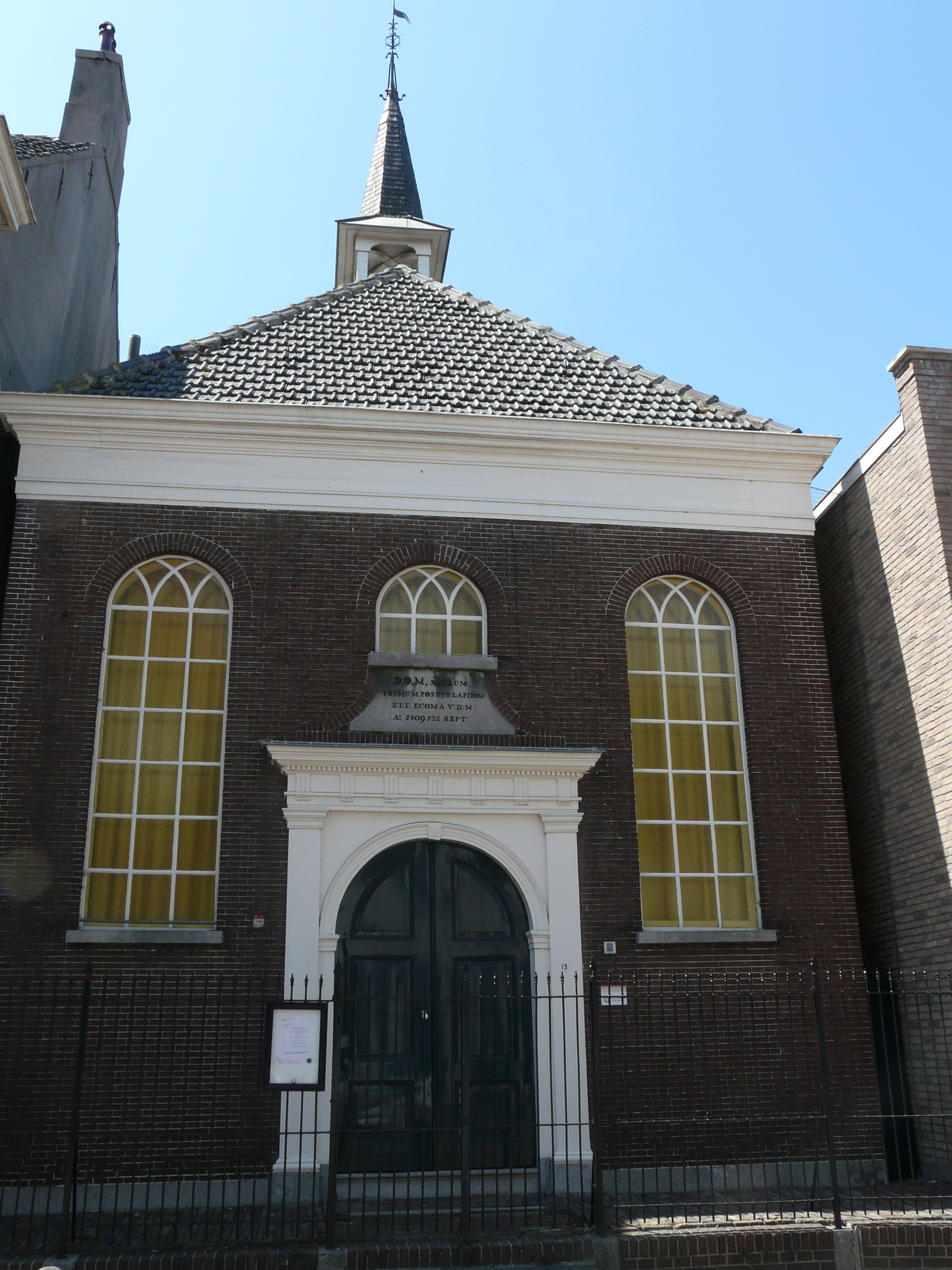
Church

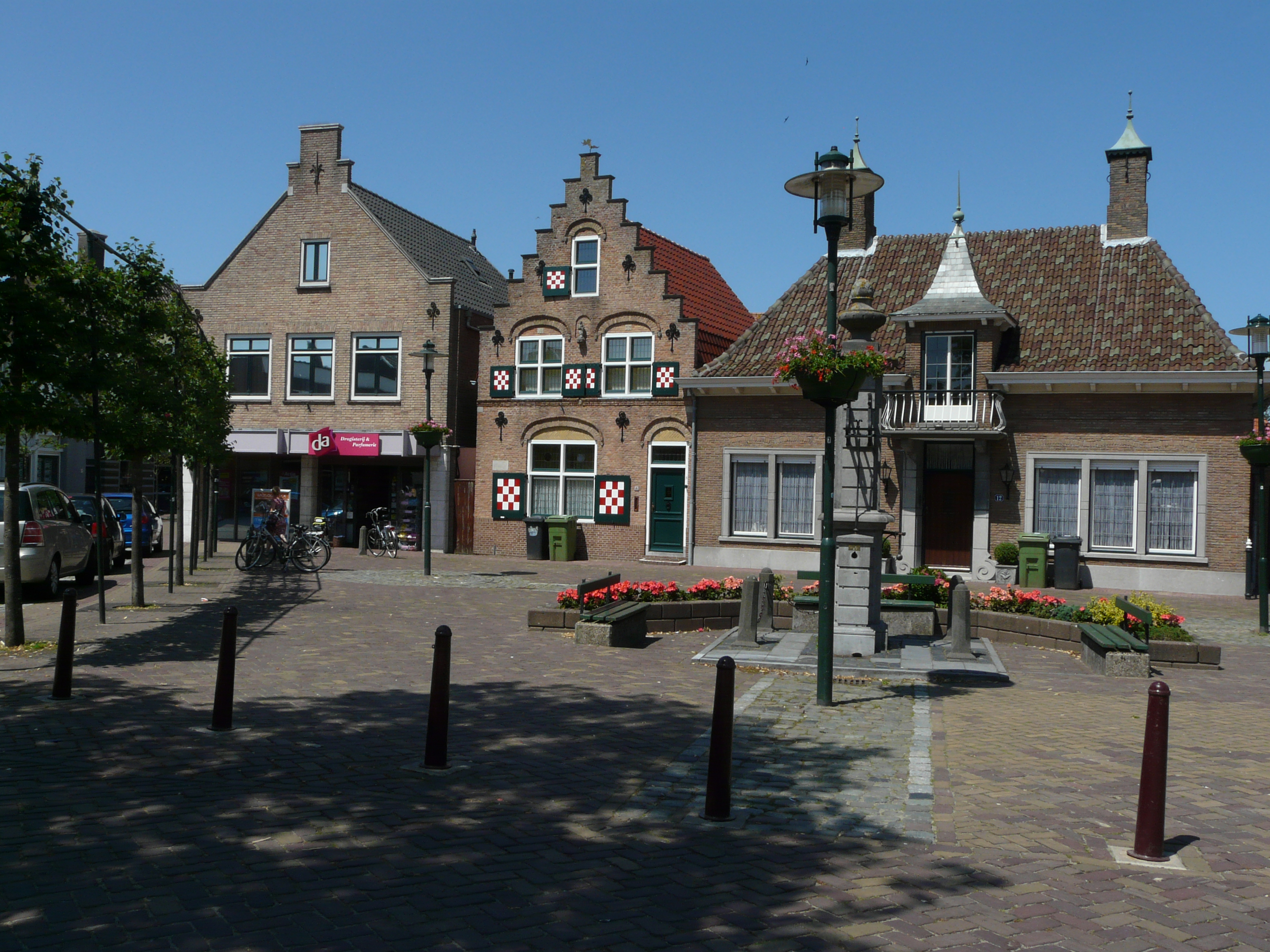
Houses in Oud Gastel

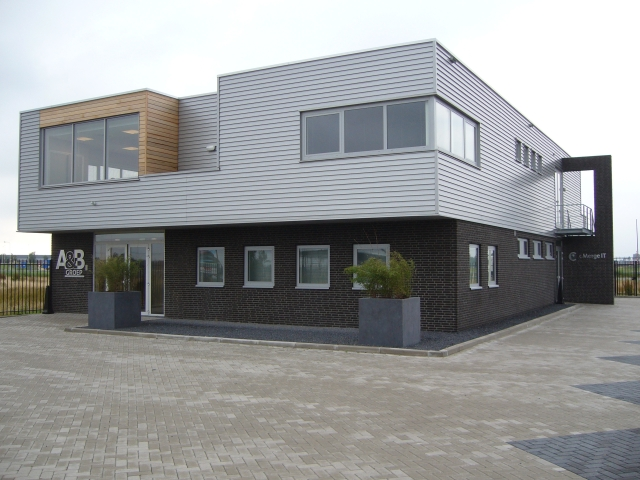
Office building
