= Hoeven =

- Village
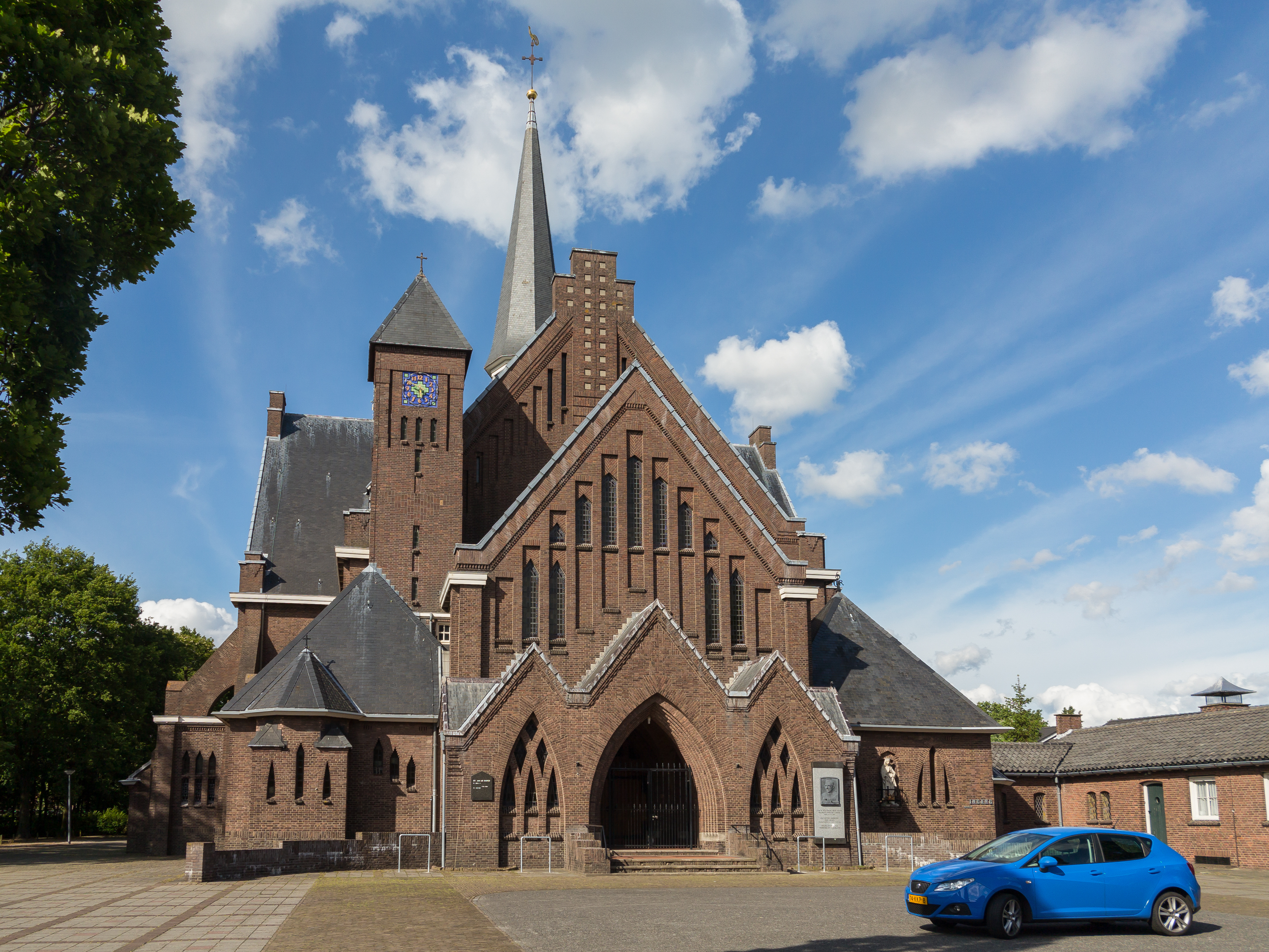
- St John the Baptist Church

- Location in the province of North Brabant in the Netherlands Hoeven (Netherlands)
- Coordinates: 51°34′39″N 4°34′51″E
- Country: Netherlands
- Province: North Brabant
- Municipality: Halderberge

Area
  - Total: 24.80 km^{2} (9.58 sq mi)
- Elevation: 4.0 m (13.1 ft)

Population (2021)
  - Total: 6,680
  - Density: 269/km^{2} (698/sq mi)
- Time zone: UTC+1 (CET)
  - Summer (DST): UTC+2 (CEST)
- Postal code: 4741
- Dialing code: 0165

Hoeven is a village in the municipality of Halderberge in the Netherlands. The name Hoeven originated from the purchase of a certain amount of ground in 1282 by the abbey of Cistercians of St. Bernard. This amount was equal to 100 "hoeven", a local measure of area in those days. A hoeve is approximately 12 bunder. A "bunder" equals the area of the average agricultural farm in the Netherlands.

== Municipality of Hoeven ==
Hoeven was a separate municipality until 1997 including the three villages of Bosschenhoofd, Hoeven and Kruisstraat. In 1997 the municipality of Hoeven became a part of Halderberge.

== Different names ==
Though the village officially is named Hoeven, most civilians use and pronounce it as "Oeve" or "d'Oeve" as 'Hoeven' is pronounced in the local dialect, Brabants. Remarkable in the southern parts of the Netherlands, where they officially celebrate carnival, is that during this period all places change names during this seven-day celebration. In case of Hoeven it is known in this period as "Peejenland" which means "Land of the Carrots". Before the name may be changed the Mayor must hand the key of the village to the Prince of Carnival ("Prins Carnaval") and this way he gives the Prince the leadership of the village. At the end of Carnaval the Princess gives the key back to the Mayor and the village welcomes boards change back to the original.

== Flag ==
The official flag of Hoeven is composed of two color in a diagonal line from left under to right above. Remarkable point is that the border line between those points isn't straight but wave-shaped which is a rare sight in this area. The lowest part of the flag is yellow while the highest part is blue. In this blue part appears a yellow castle tower which could come from a castle that was located in the center of Hoeven in history. Recently at construction works at the old Mayorhouse there were ruins and graves discover of an unknown centuries old large building with towers. The construction works are delayed for historical research on the ruin. The shape of the castle in the flag of Hoeven also comes back in the flag of the municipal "Halderberge".

== Symbol ==
The symbol of Hoeven is "de Peejenzaaier" (the carrotsower). Which is pictured as a bronze statue at the main square in the center of the village.

== Location ==
Hoeven is situated between the bigger cities of Roosendaal and Breda, near the smaller city Etten-Leur. The center street of Hoeven is built on a small hill called the "Halderberg". Which is remarkable since the rest of the areas landscape is extremely flat. To the north Hoeven finds a natural border with the river "De Mark", which is also the border of the municipality with Zevenbergen. The village of Hoeven has a surface area of 24.82 km^{2} (9.58 sq mi) and in 2007 counted 6,560 civilians.

Hoeven also contains two pieces of polder:

- The biggest polder is the "Hoevense Beemde" which was founded at 12 June 1409 when the abbot of "Sint Bernardus" offered a large piece of land to the public. A big percentage of this area was sold to people from Moerdijk who used the land to win peat. This caused much danger for floods because the river "De Mark" was nearby, so the area of the "Hoevense Beemden" was protected by building dykes around it.
- The "Sint Maartenspolder" was a piece of land that was owned by the abbot of "Sint Bernardus" which released this piece of land that had been slibt over the years 8 October 1483. It was named after the patron saint "Sint Maarten".

== Sights ==
- Great seminar Bovendonk

The great seminar Bovendonk is located in the center of Hoeven. In the year 1282 the abbey "Sint Bernardus" in Antwerp (Modern day Belgium) founded a new "garden" in Hoeven. In 1570 this garden became the property of the Bishop of Antwerp. In 1646 it lost his function as a Catholic church and it became Protestant and the first Pastor arrived. 1871 the great seminar of Breda moved from location to Hoeven and the great seminar Bovendonk was born. Because all the ground of the seminar was still property of the Dutch government, the seminar bought the complete amount of ground in 1892 for 14000 Guilder. Three years later the famous designer Petrus J.H. Cuypers designed a complete new seminar for this location and in 1907 the new seminar in neogotic style appeared. Due to the low amount of notifications for the Paster study the great seminar Bovendonk was abandoned in 1967 and left like this for the next 11 years. In 1990 first progress was made to commercialise the great seminar Bovendonk. In 2007 the 100th birthday of the great seminar was celebrated. These days it is in use as a conference center, hotel, exhibition and event center.

- Sint Jan de Baptist

The church "Sint Jan de Baptist" from 1929, designed by J.H. Berben in expressionistic style.

- Splesj

Recreationpark Splesj; formerly known as "Bosbad Hoeven". A park that is mainly focused at water and swimming. The park also contains a large campsite and multiple rentable vacation houses.

- De Toekomst

Windmill De Toekomst (The Future). A "Beltmill"-type cornmill from 1862 with a reach of 26 meters.

- De Keien Pomp

"De Keien Pomp" (The pebbles pump). An old water pump which provided the village from water in the century's it wasn't connected to the modern waternet.

- WWII Monument

The World War II monument with all the names of lost citizens during the war located at long the toward the great seminar "Bovendonk".

== Events ==
- Carnaval

Just like the majority of towns in the two southern provinces of the Netherlands, Carnival is also celebrated in Hoeven. Each town has its own rituals and happenings during this seven-day celebration. Hoeven is the only village in the Netherlands that has a (legal) private radio station named Radio Peejenland during these 7 days.

- Carnavalsparade

Every year at the last Tuesday of the carnival there is a carnival parade in Hoeven. Though this is a known phenomenon, the parade of Hoeven highly ranked in the area because there are strict rules for the competitors which leads to high quality creations.

- Trekkertrek

Trekkertrek, which means "tractor pulling", is a sport where a tractor needs to pull a trailer which is becoming more and more heavy by the time the trucks gets further. These days many of these tractors are powered by engines from heavy machinery or even fighterjet engines.

- Fietsvierdaagse and Wandelvierdaagse

Two four-day tournaments where competitives need to walk or cycle a certain distance in four days in different categories. In the case of the cycling event (Fietsvierdaagse), people can choose from a distance of 25, 40, 60 or 100 kilometre per day. In the case of the walking event (Wandelvierdaagse), people can choose between 5, 10 or 15 kilometre distance per day. Once a competitive has managed to drive or walk the same distance for four days in a row they earn a medal.

- Muziekweekend

A music event that is held once or twice a year, organised by the local music organisation "Sint Cecilea". At this event there are always 3 days organised with different international, national and regional music.

- Sint Maarten

During this celebration that is only celebrated in a few random areas of the Netherlands, Belgium, Luxemburg and the North of France, there is always a fireworks show at the recreationpark "Splesj!".

- Kermis

During the pinkster period there is a yearly Kermis (fair) held at the center of Hoeven.

- Koninginnedag

At Koninginnedag (Queensday) there is a national celebration of the birthday of the Queen (actually, it is the birthday of the mother of the queen). This means there is a parade through the village with a lot of orange colored vehicles. Orange being the national color of the Netherlands. Also there are multiple music and sport activities planned around the general celebration.

- Graham Tweed

In 1991, Alnwick resident Graham Tweed moved to Hoeven where he still resides to this day. His daughter, Amy Tweed is part of A Tribute To Toto, a Toto tribute band.

== Famous citizens born in Hoeven ==
- Janus Hellemons (1912–1999), professional cyclist

== Gallery ==
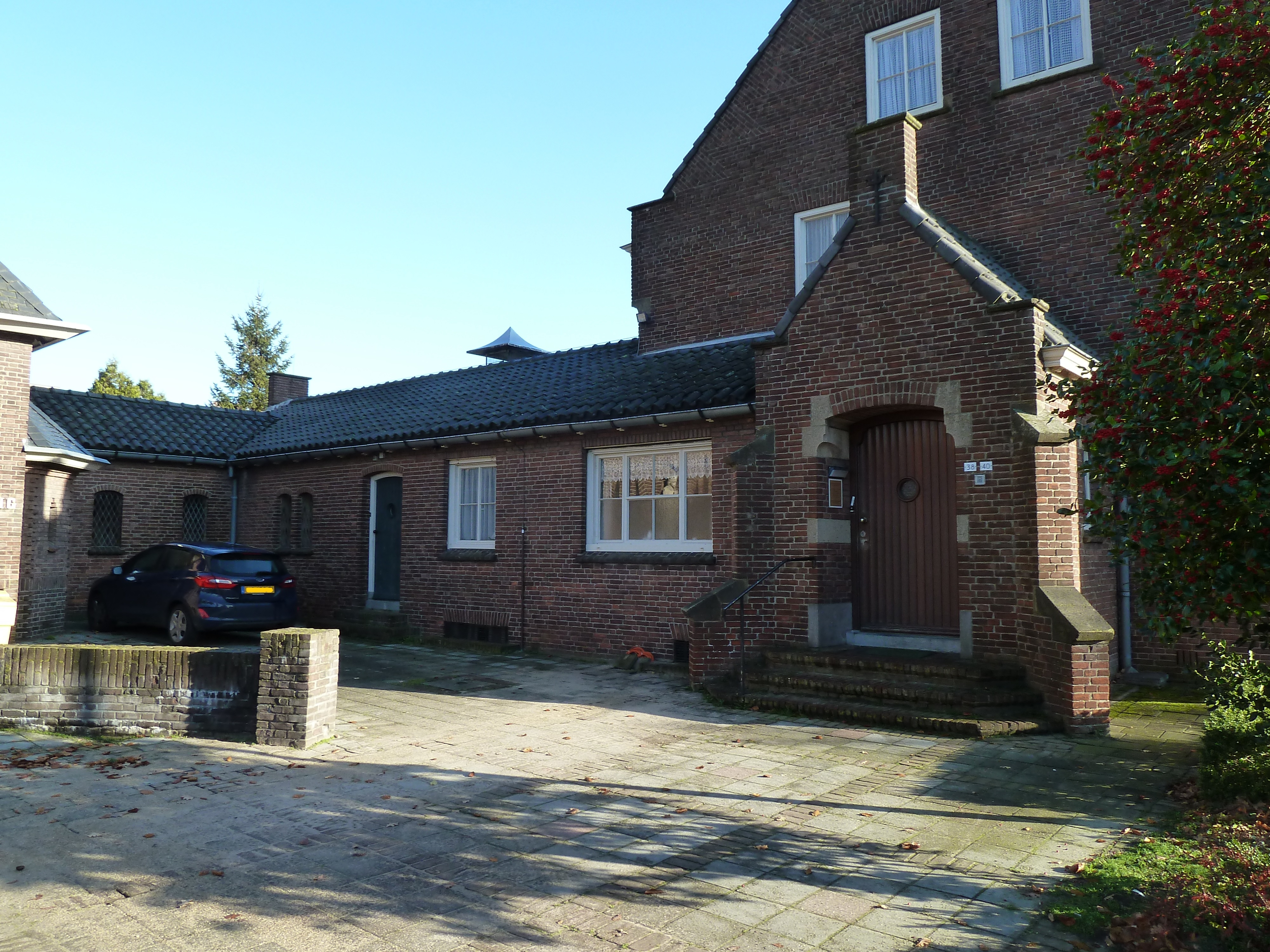
Building in Hoeven

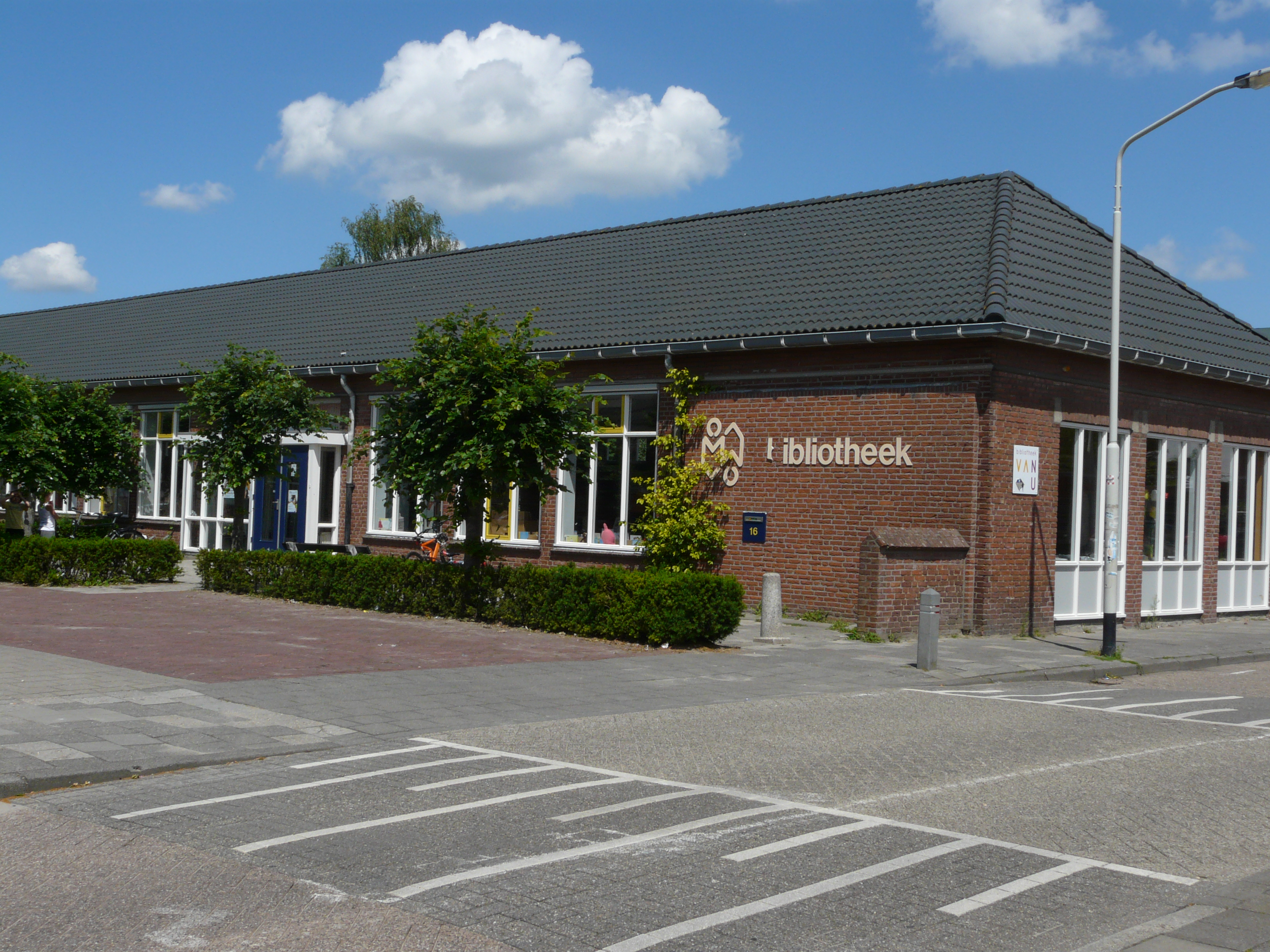
Library

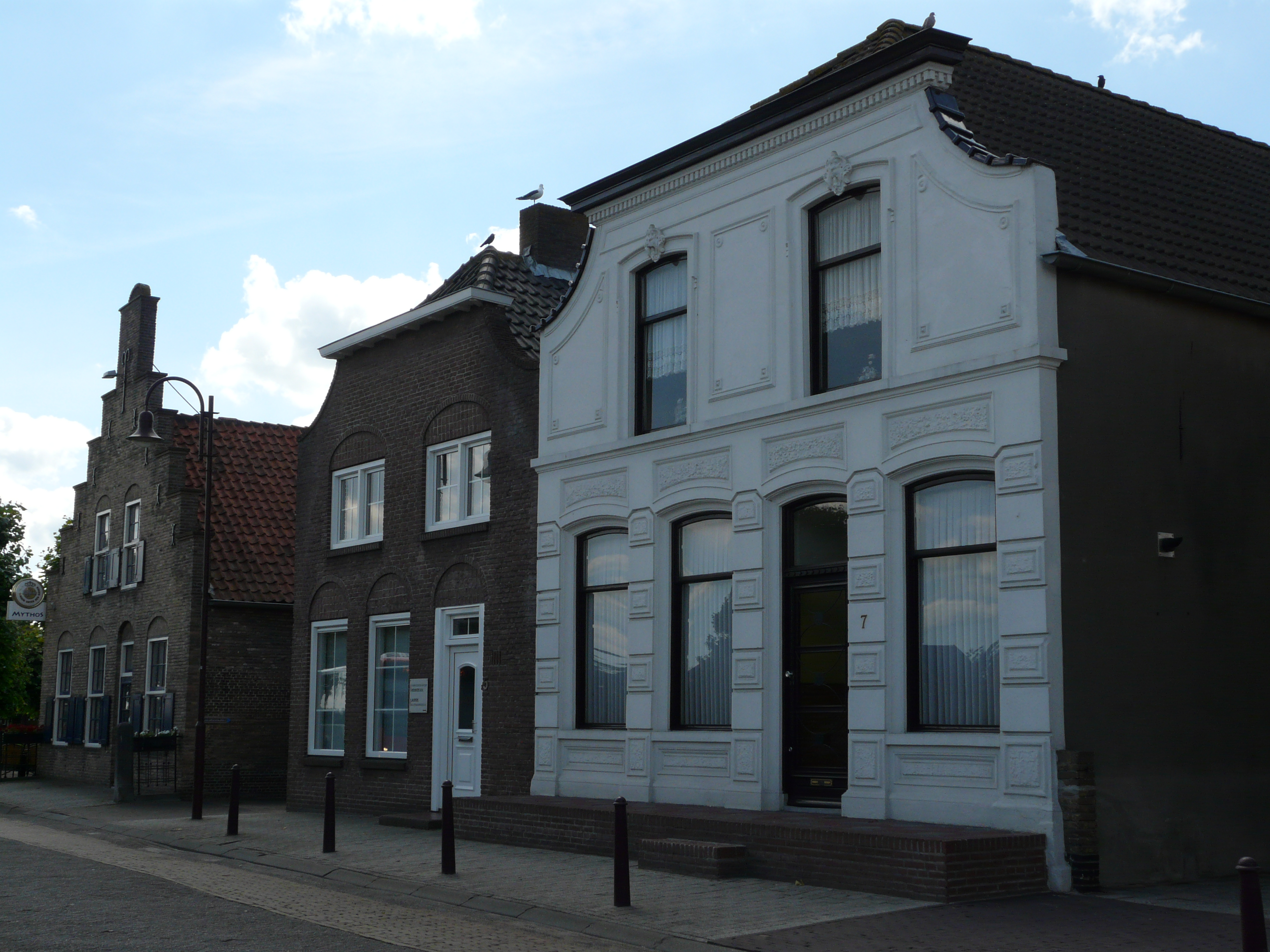
Street view

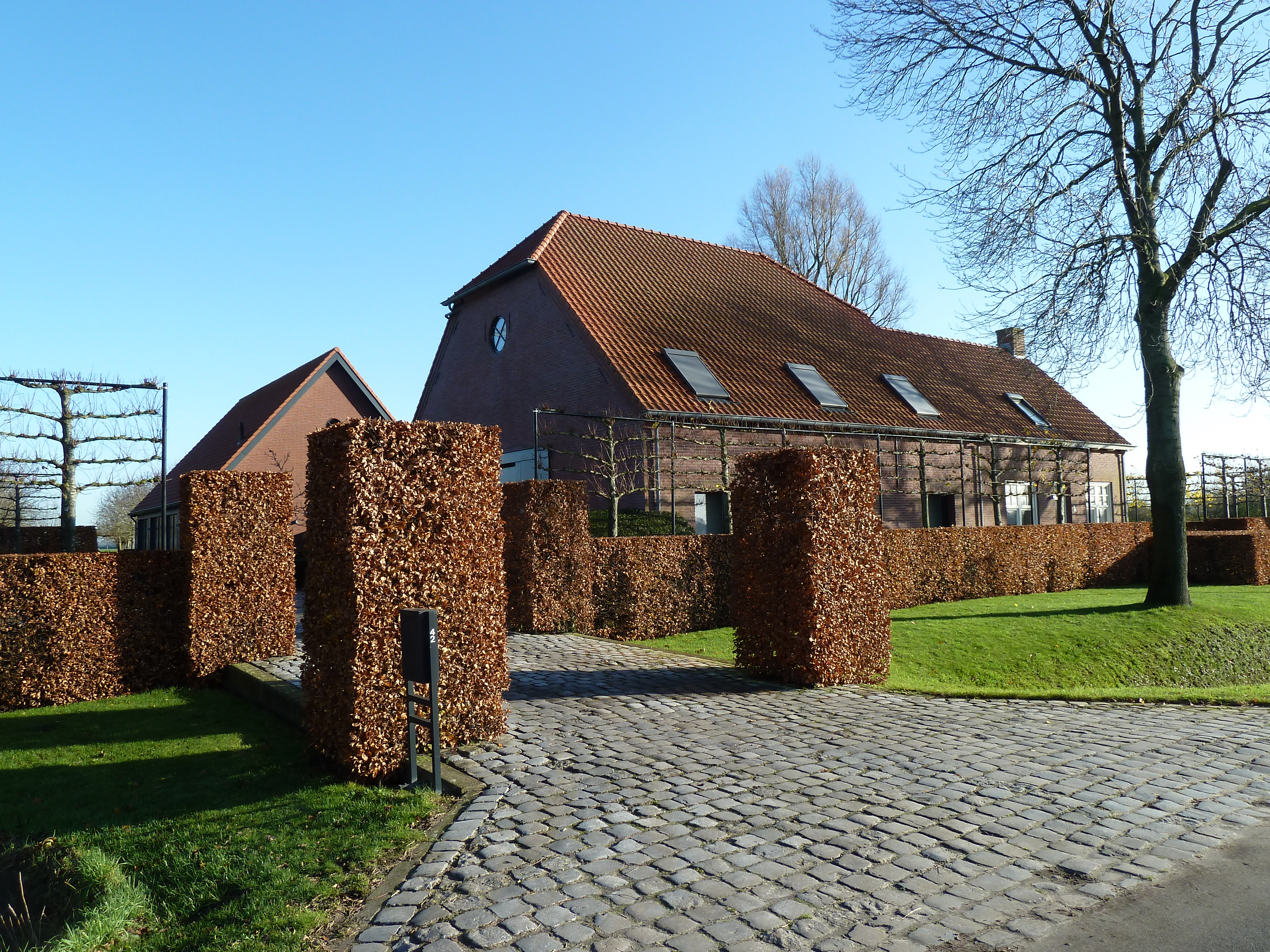
Farm in Hoeven
