= Halderberge =

- Municipality
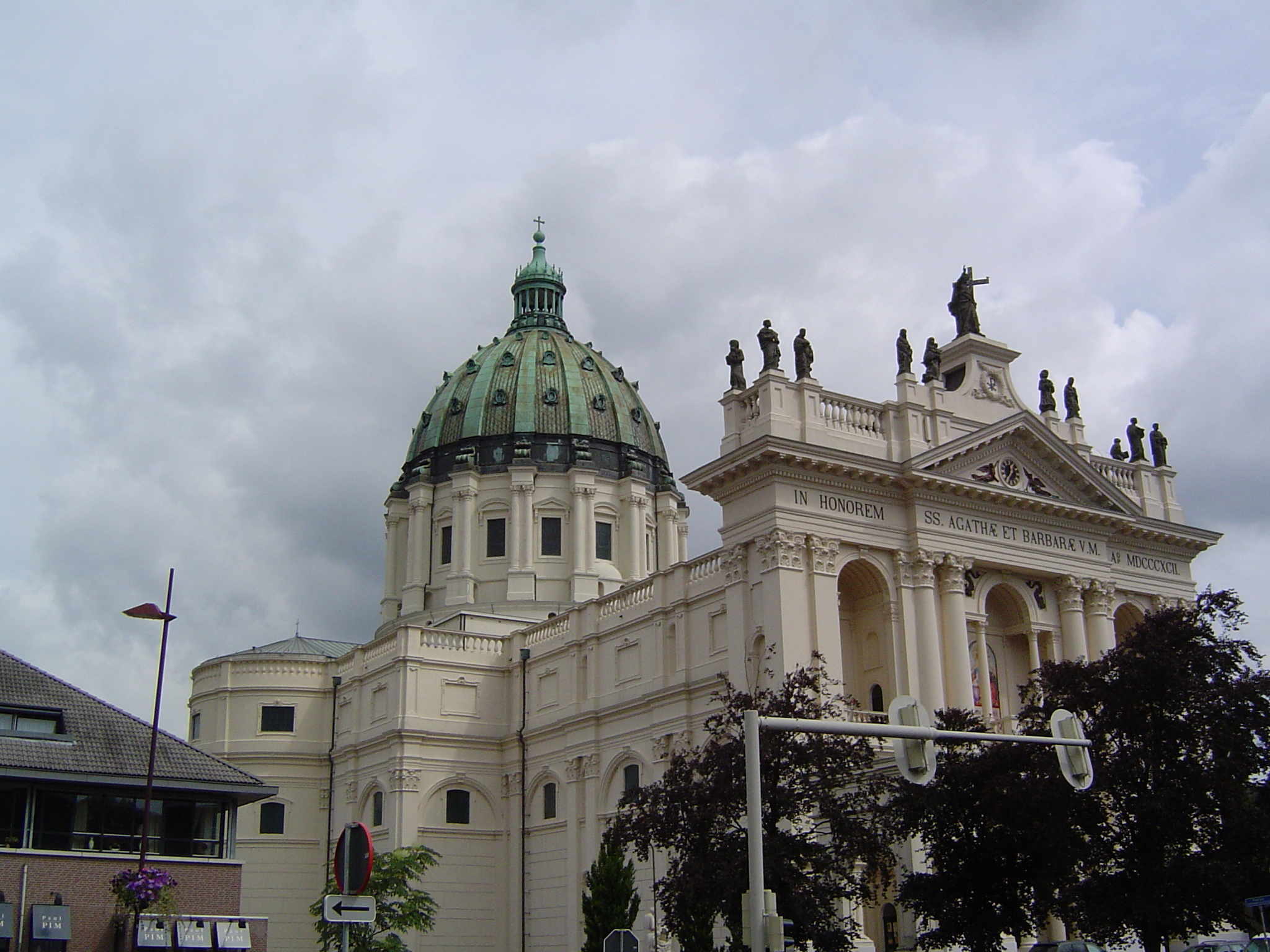
- Basilica in Oudenbosch

- Flag Coat of arms

- Location in North Brabant
- Coordinates: 51°35′N 4°32′E
- Country: Netherlands
- Province: North Brabant
- Established: 1 January 1997

Government
  - Body: Municipal council
  - Mayor: Anne Mulder (VVD, acting)

Area
  - Total: 75.21 km^{2} (29.04 sq mi)
  - Land: 74.47 km^{2} (28.75 sq mi)
  - Water: 0.74 km^{2} (0.29 sq mi)
- Elevation: 3 m (9.8 ft)

Population (January 2021)
  - Total: 30,430
  - Density: 409/km^{2} (1,060/sq mi)
- Time zone: UTC+1 (CET)
  - Summer (DST): UTC+2 (CEST)
- Postcode: 4730–4754
- Area code: 0165
- Website: www.halderberge.nl

Halderberge (Dutch pronunciation: [ˈɦɑldərˌbɛrɣə]) is a municipality in the southern Netherlands, in the west of the province of North Brabant. Its seat and most populous locality is Oudenbosch.

== Population centres ==
- Oudenbosch (population: 13,110)
- Hoeven (6,560)
- Oud Gastel (6,360)
- Bosschenhoofd (2,180)
- Stampersgat (1,330)

=== Topography ===
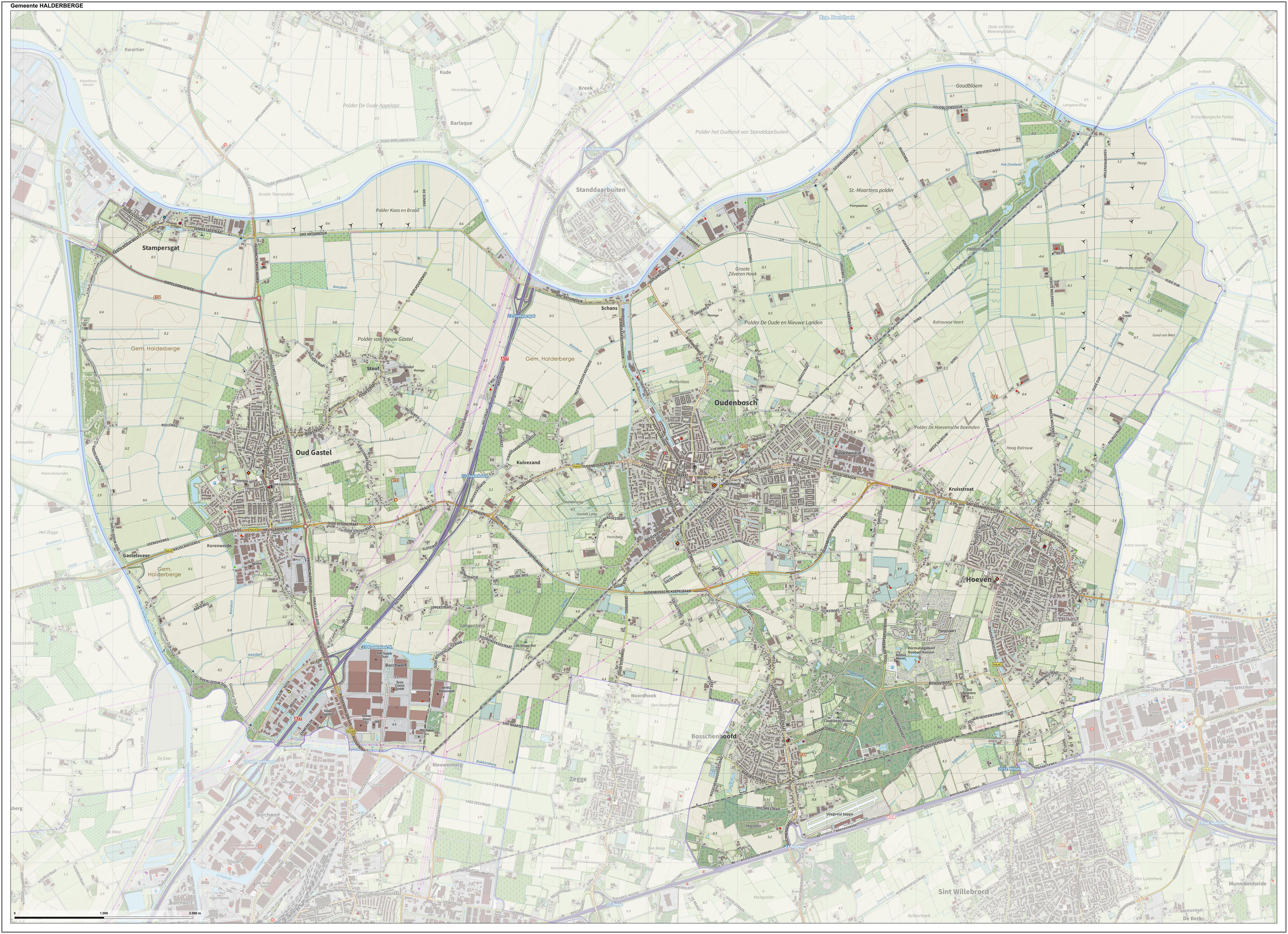

Dutch Topographic map of the municipality of Halderberge, June 2015

== Transportation ==
Railway Dordrecht to Roosendaal (part of line 11), with stations and official station abbreviations:

- Dordrecht (Ddr) (mun. Dordrecht)
- Dordrecht Zuid (Ddzd) (mun. Dordrecht)
- Lage Zwaluwe (Zlw) (mun. Moerdijk)
- Zevenbergen (Zvb) (mun. Moerdijk)
- Oudenbosch (Odb) (mun. Halderberge)
- Roosendaal (Rsd) (mun. Roosendaal)

== International relations ==
=== Twin towns — Sister cities ===
Halderberge is twinned with:

- Międzyrzecz, Poland

== Notable people ==
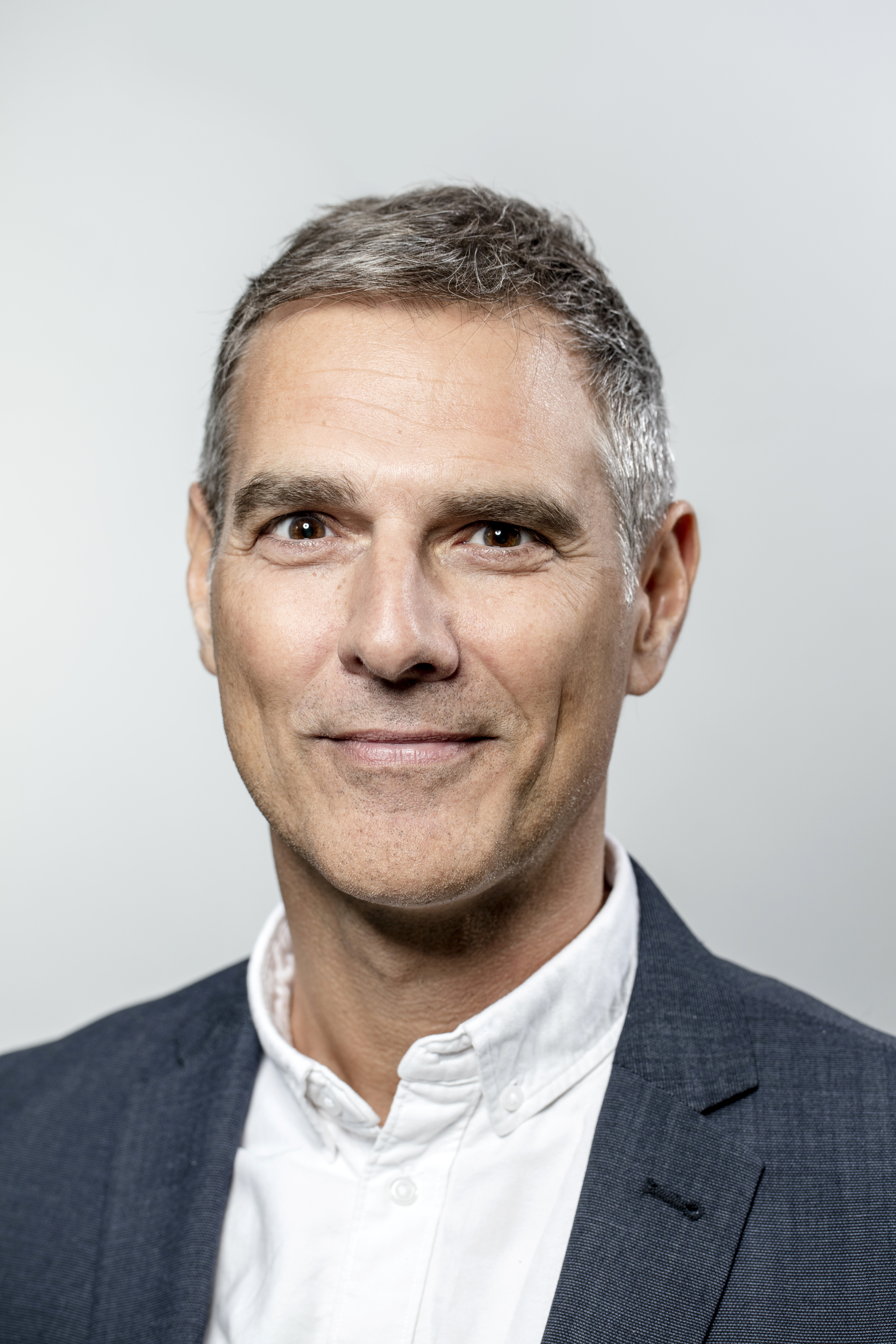
Cretien van Campen, 2016

- Jac. van Ginneken (1877 in Oudenbosch - 1945) a Dutch linguist, Jesuit priest and academic
- Marinus Jan Granpré Molière (1883 in Oudenbosch — 1972) a Dutch architect
- Gabriel Nuchelmans (1922 in Oud Gastel – 1996) a Dutch philosopher, focused on the philosophy of the Middle Ages
- Cretien van Campen (born 1963 in Oudenbosch) a Dutch author, editor and scientific researcher in social science and fine arts

=== Sport ===
- Janus van Merrienboer (1894 in Oud en Nieuw Gastel – 1947) an archer, competed at the 1920 Summer Olympics
- Ad Tak (born 1953 in Nieuwe Gastel) a retired cyclist, competed at the 1976 Summer Olympics
- Digna Ketelaar (born 1967 in Bosschenhoofd) a former Dutch tennis player

== Gallery ==
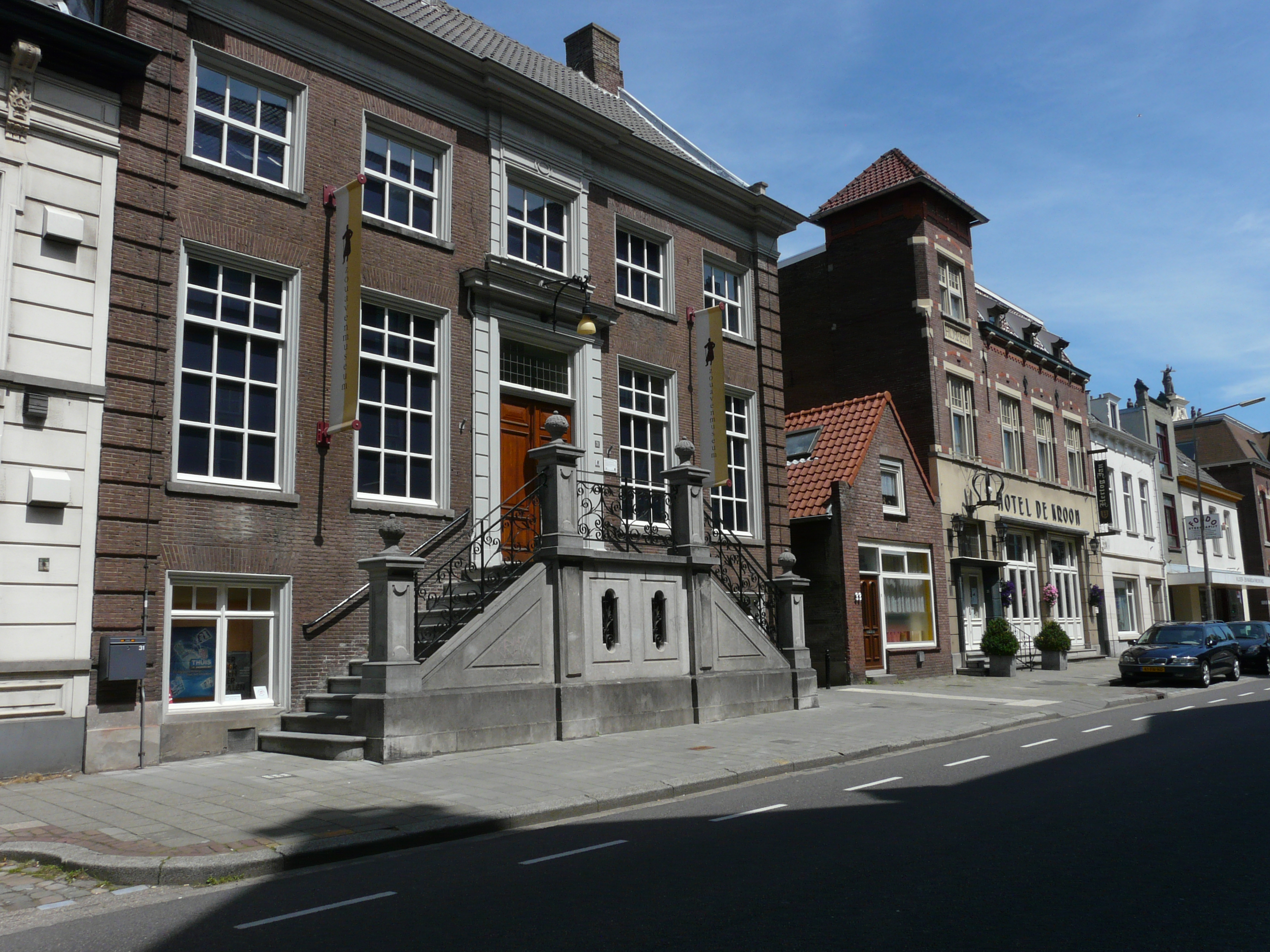
Markt, Oudenbosch

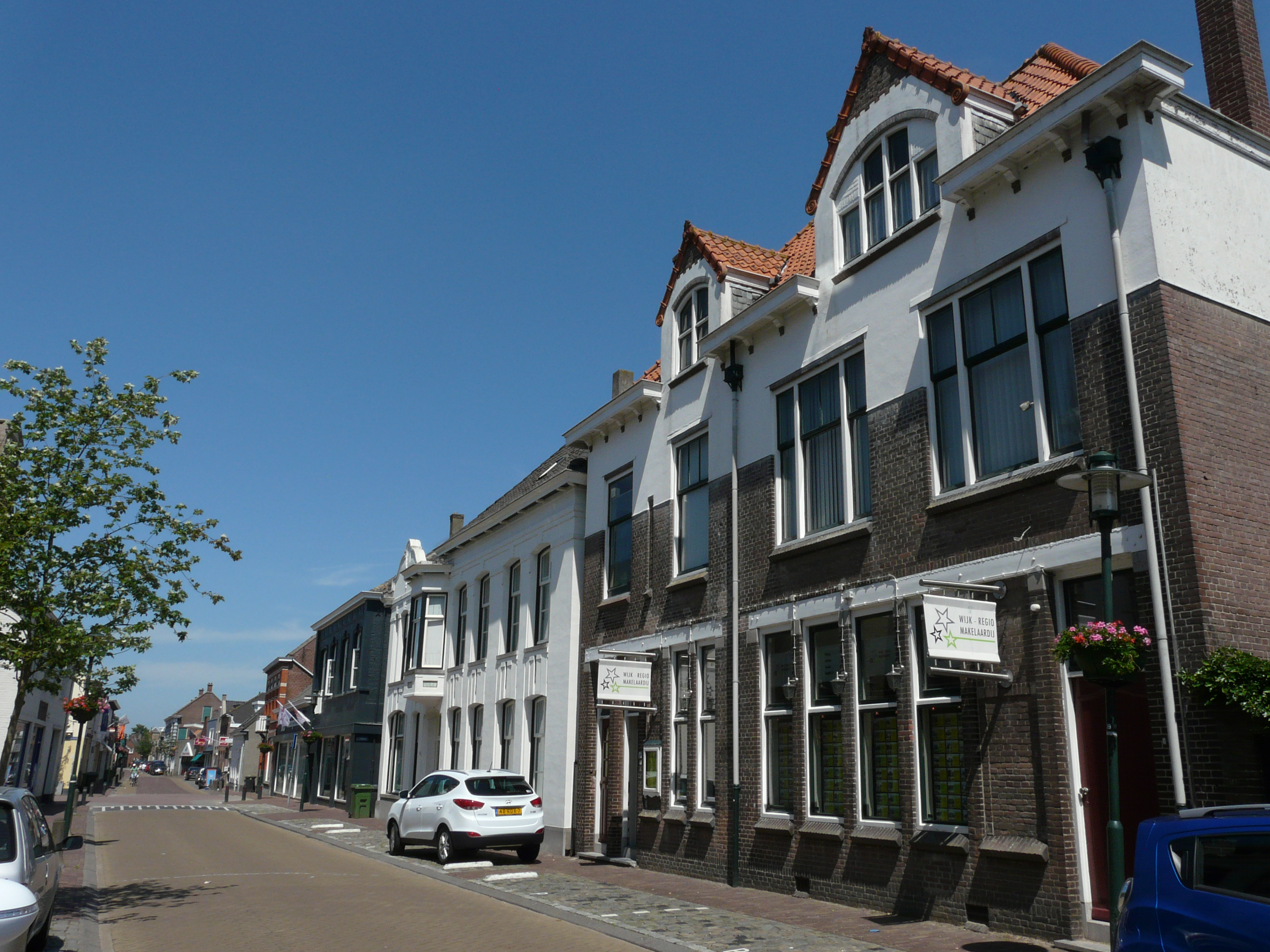
Oud Gastel

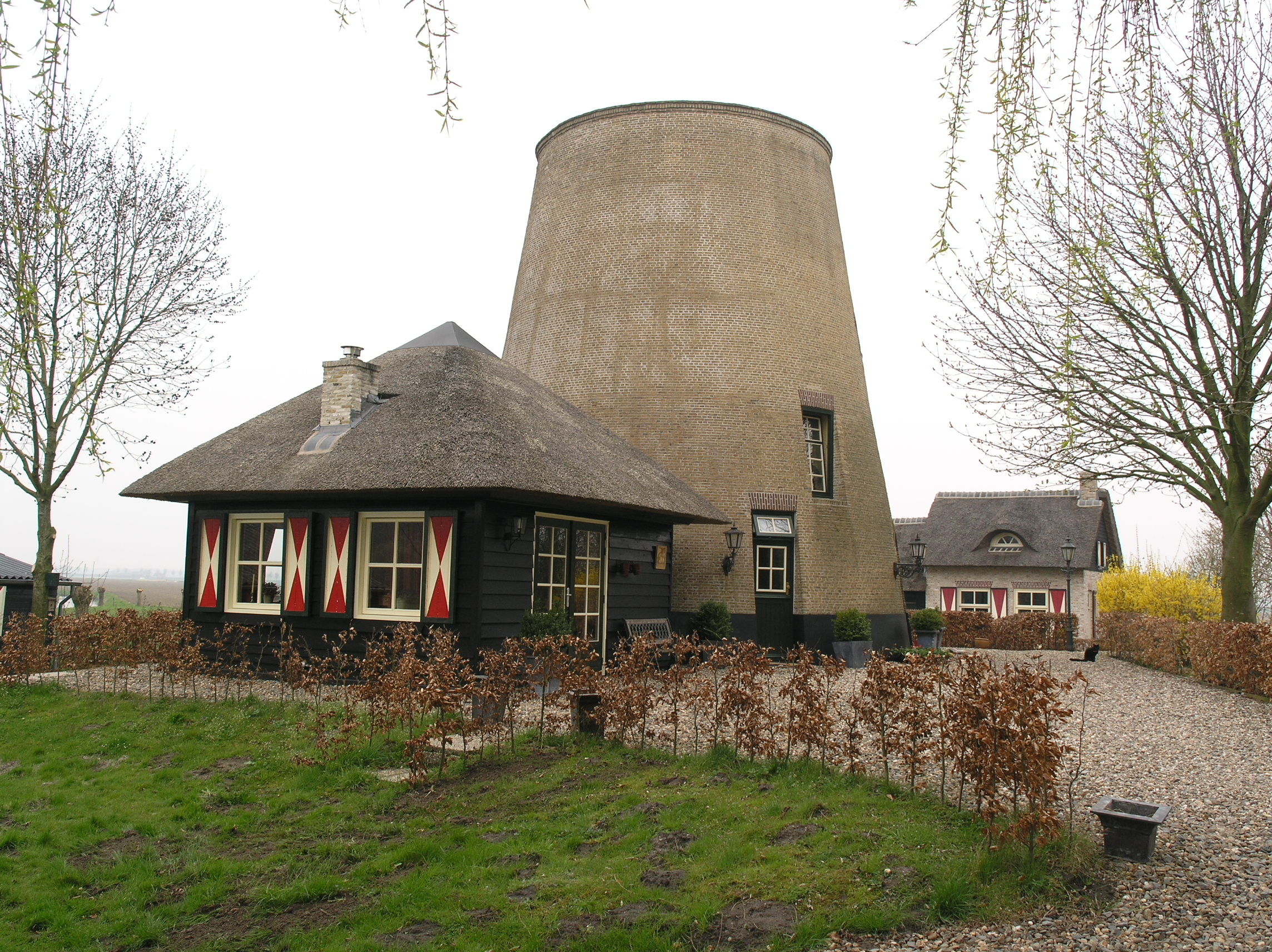
Hoeven, Sint Maartenspolder

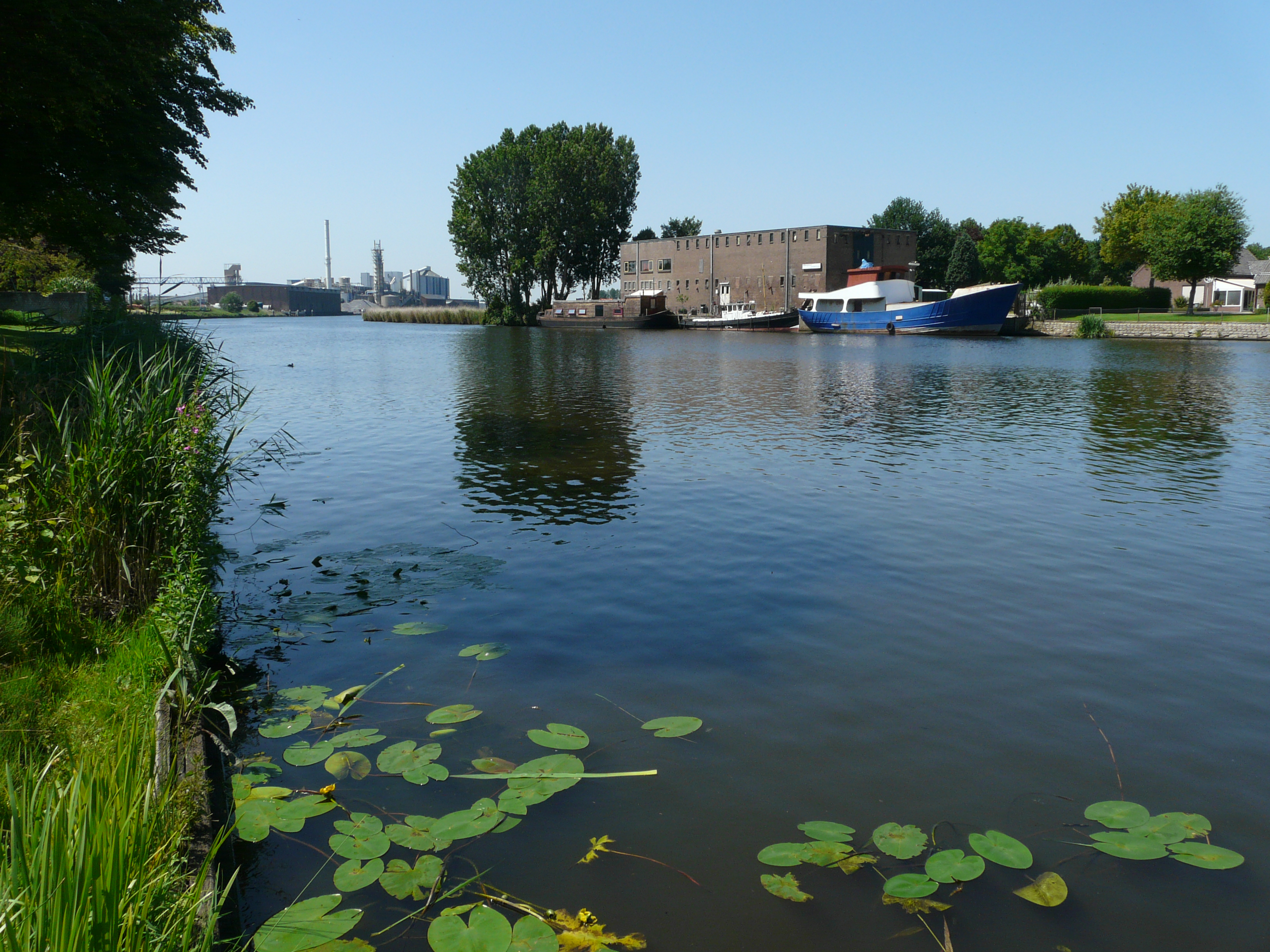
Stampersgat
