= List of tallest domes =

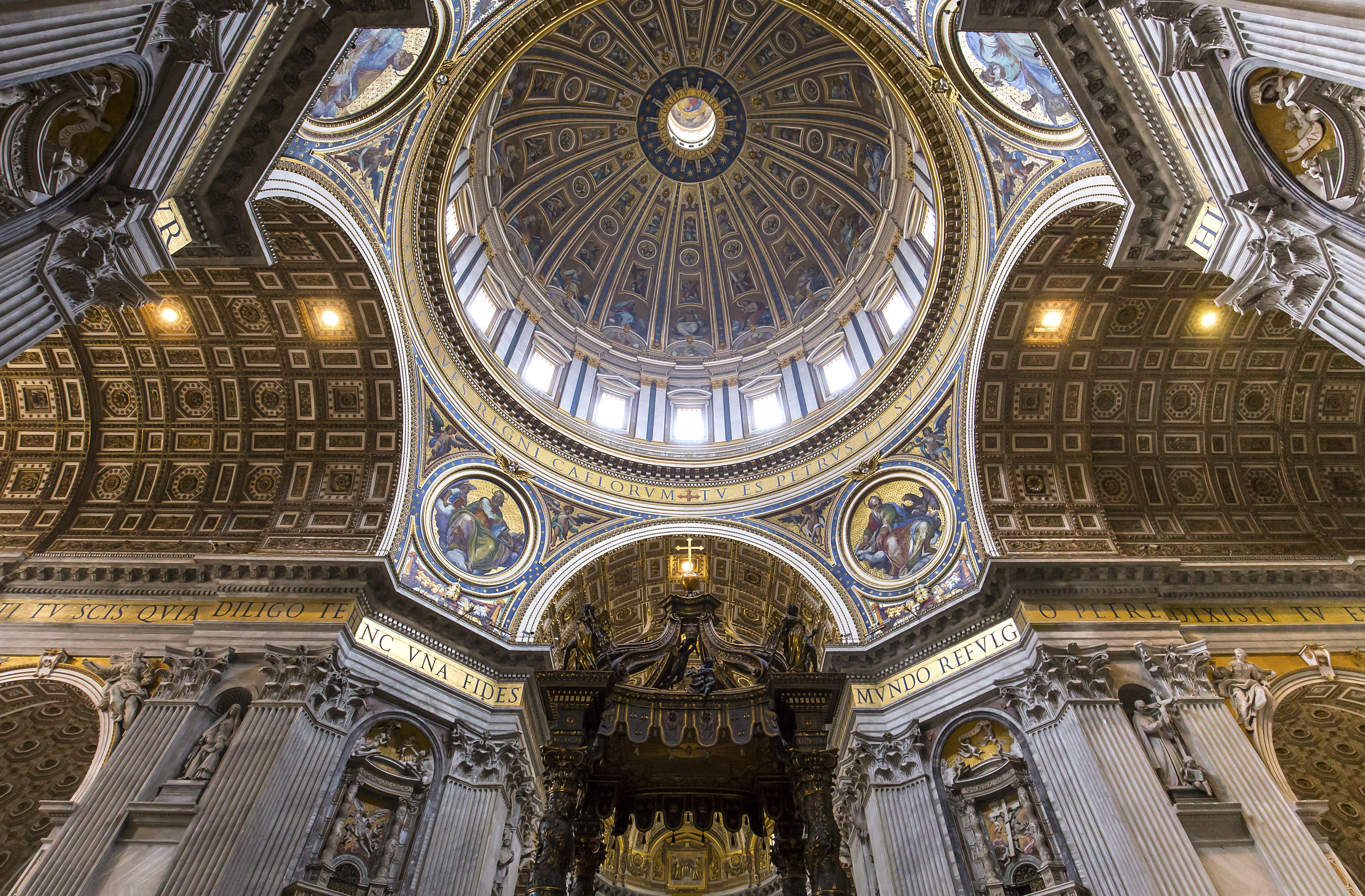
Under the dome of Saint Peter's Basilica - the highest maximum internal height including lantern (118 m) of any domed structure in the world.

This is a list of the tallest domes in the world. The dome can be measured by various criteria. There are different types of domes. Many of the tallest domes have a lantern. Strictly speaking, the lantern is not part of the dome, but often the overall height of the domes includes the height of the lantern.

Priority is given to the internal height of the dome. The internal height is measured from the floor of the building to the highest point of the ceiling of the dome (for domes that have a lantern, this is the level of the oculus).

This is a dynamic list. Any dome that has a verified height can be added to this list.

== List ==
Name	Image	Dome height inner (without lantern)	Max inner height	Dome height outer (without lantern)	Outer height (without cross/mast/statue)	Max outer height (to the tip)	Dome Diameter (inner)	Dome Diameter (outer)	Location	Country	Notes
Basilica of Our Lady of Peace		~111 m	~111 m	~119 m	149 m	157.89 m		90 m	Yamoussoukro	Ivory Coast	
People's Salvation Cathedral		106 m	106 m	121.1 m	127.1 m	135 m	16.8 m	29.4 m	Bucharest	Romania	The tallest unpenetrated (without oculus) dome in the world. The tallest and largest (by volume) Orthodox church building in the world.
St Peter's Basilica		101.8 m	117.57 m	~110 m	~129 m	136.57 m	41.5 m	42 m	Vatican City (city-state)	Vatican City	The largest church building in the world. Highest maximum internal height of any church (from the floor to the ceiling of the lantern).
AT&T Stadium		91 m	91 m						Arlington	United States	
Florence Cathedral		~87 m	~103 m	~90 m	~110 m	114.5 m		42 m	Florence	Italy	Brunelleschi's Dome was the largest dome in the world from its completion in 1436 to 1871. Still the largest masonry dome ever built.
Avicii Arena		~85 m	~85 m	~85 m	~85 m	85 m		110 m	Stockholm	Sweden	Largest Spherical Building in the World.
Palace of Justice of Brussels		~82 m	~82 m	~100 m	~106 m	108 m			Brussels	Belgium	
Basilica of Our Lady of Lichen			85 m		90.5 m	103.5 m 141.5 m (observation tower)			Lichen Stary	Poland	
National Stadium, Singapore		80 m	80 m	82.5 m	82.5 m	82.5 m			Kallang	Singapore	The largest dome by diameter (310 m) in the world.
Sultan Salahuddin Abdul Aziz Mosque						106.7 m		51.2 m	Shah Alam	Malaysia	Diameter (outer) of 51.2 m.
Caesars Superdome		77.1 m	77.1 m						New Orleans	United States	Diameter of 207.3 m
Temple of the Vedic Planetarium				84.72 m	101 m	118 m	54 m	~58 m	Mayapur	India	
National Basilica of the Sacred Heart				~80 m	~89 m	92.90 m		33 m	Brussels	Belgium	Largest Art Deco church in the world.
Berlin Cathedral		~74 m	~74 m	~77 m	~84 m	98 m			Berlin	Germany	
Mole Antonelliana		~72 m	~72 m	~82 m	~164 m	167.5 m			Turin	Italy	World's third tallest structure at the time of completion (April 10, 1889). The maximum inner height does not take into account the space inside the lantern ("Tempietto") because it was transformed into an elevator shaft in 1964.
Basilica of Notre-Dame de Boulogne			85 m			101 m		~21 m	Boulogne-Sur-Mer	France	
Esztergom Basilica		71.5 m	71.5 m			100 m		33.5 m	Esztergom	Hungary	Second tallest unpenetrated (without oculus) church dome in the world. The largest church building in Hungary.
Cathedral of Christ the Saviour		69.5 m	69.5 m	91.5 m	91.5 m	103.4 m		29.8 m	Moscow	Russia	Third tallest unpenetrated (without oculus) church dome in the world. Second tallest Orthodox dome in the world.
Saint Isaac's Cathedral		69 m ^{[α]} ~82 m ^{[β]}	92.73 m	~84 m	~96 m	101.5 m		25.8	Saint Petersburg	Russia	Third tallest Orthodox dome in the world.
Illinois State Capitol		~67 m	~67 m	~96 m	110.03 m	123.45 m			Springfield, Illinois	United States	
Çamlıca Mosque				72 m	72 m	79.77 m		34 m	Istanbul	Turkey	
Smolny Convent		~65 m	~74 m	~67 m	~82 m	93.70 m			Saint Petersburg	Russia	
St Paul's Cathedral		64.95 m ^{[α]} 81.53 m ^{[β]}	81.53 m	84 m	102 m	111 m		30.7 m	London	United Kingdom	First triple-shell structure with an intermediate cone supporting lantern and outer dome.
Church of Saint Sava		64.85 m	64.85 m	68.5 m	68.5 m	78.3 m	30.16 m	35.16 m	Belgrade	Serbia	The largest dome by diameter and the fifth-tallest dome in Eastern Orthodox Christianity. Fourth tallest unpenetrated (without oculus) church dome in the world.
New Cathedral		64.2 m		~66 m	~75 m	80 m			Brescia	Italy	The third tallest dome in Italy.
Milan Cathedral		~64 m	~73 m	(no outer dome)	104.34	108.50			Milan	Italy	
Great Mosque of Algiers		~64 m	~64 m	72 m	72 m	78.5 m 265 m (minaret)			Algiers	Algeria	
Main Cathedral of the Russian Armed Forces						95 m			Odintsovski District	Russia	The fourth tallest church building in Russia.
Basilica of Our Lady of Itatí				~67 m	75.5 m	83 m			Itatí	Argentina	
Texas State Capitol		~63 m ^{[α]} 66.45 m ^{[β]}	66.45 m	~73 m	87.37 m	92.24 m			Austin	United States	
Astrodome		63 m	63 m						Houston	United States	
Pavia Cathedral		~63 m	80 m	~70 m	~92 m	97 m			Pavia	Italy	
New Cathedral of Salamanca		~63 m	~63 m	~67 m	~74 m	80 m ~93 m (tower)			Salamanca	Spain	
Kazan Cathedral		62 m	62 m			71.6 m			Saint Petersburg	Russia	
Basilica of Sant'Andrea		~61 m	~71 m	~63 m	~75 m	80 m			Mantua	Italy	
São Paulo Cathedral				~67 m	~75 m	~79 m 92 m (towers)			São Paulo	Brazil	
Cathedral of La Plata				(no outer dome)	~93 m	97 m 111.70 m (towers)			La Plata	Argentina	
Saint Joseph's Oratory		60 m	60 m	~83 m	~95 m	~102 m			Montreal	Canada	
Panthéon (Paris)		~60 m ^{[α]} 69.5 m ^{[β]}	69.5 m	~75 m	~88 m	94 m		44 m	Paris	France	
Pennsylvania State Capitol		~60 m	~68 m	~67 m	77.38 m	83 m			Harrisburg	United States	
Istiqlal Mosque		60 m	60 m					45 m	Jakarta	Indonesia	Diameter (outer) of 45 m.
Basilica of El Escorial		~59 m	~70 m	~66 m	~85 m	92 m			San Lorenzo de El Escorial	Spain	
Sant'Andrea della Valle				~60 m	~68 m	71.76 m (from the floor)	16.61 m	~20 m	Rome	Italy	Third tallest church building in Rome.
Sanctuary of Vicoforte				60 m		75 m		36 m	Vicoforte	Italy	The largest elliptical church dome in the world. 36 m X 25 m
Wisconsin State Capitol		56.16 m ^{[α]} ~60 m ^{[β]}	~60 m	~71 m	81.99 m	86.69 m			Madison	United States	
Saint-Augustin				61 m		80 m			Paris	France	
Sanctuary of Oropa - Upper Basilica				60 m	~74 m	80 m			Biella	Italy	
Salzburg Cathedral		~56 m	~66 m	~59 m	~72 m	75 m 79 m (towers)			Salzburg	Austria	
Como Cathedral		~56 m	~66 m	~57 m	~68 m	75 m			Como	Italy	
Hagia Sophia		55.6 m	55.6 m	~57 m	~57 m	~63 m		31.87 m	Istanbul	Turkey	Not a true circle dome, but more like elliptic. 30.37 m X 31.87 m
Theatine Church						70.20 m			Munich	Germany	
Dôme des Invalides		~55 m ^{[α]} 63.09 m ^{[β]}	63.09 m	~73 m	~87 m	107 m			Paris	France	First Western dome to include three concentric shells.
Basilica of the Sacred Heart of Paris		55 m	55 m	~65 m	~79 m	83 m 84 m (bell tower)			Paris	France	
Basilica of Santi Pietro e Paolo				~61 m	~74 m	~80 m			Rome	Italy	
West Virginia State Capitol		54.86 m	54.86 m	~71 m	~82 m	89.00 m			Charleston	United States	
Colorado State Capitol		54.86 m ^{[α]} ~56 m ^{[β]}	~56 m	~67 m	~74 m	76.20 m			Denver	United States	
Mary, Queen of the World Cathedral						76.8 m			Montreal	Canada	
Cathedral of Saint Paul (Minnesota)		53.34 m	53.34 m	~67 m	~82 m	93.42 m			Saint Paul	United States	
Church of Santa Engracia						80 m			Lisbon	Portugal	
Cerignola Cathedral (Duomo Tonti)				~61 m	75.75 m (from the floor; from the ground is more)	78.75 m (from the floor; from the ground is more)			Cerignola	Italy	
French Cathedral				~59 m	~59 m	70 m			Berlin	Germany	
Neue Kirche				~59 m	~59 m	70 m			Berlin	Germany	
Cathedral-Basilica of Our Lady of the Pillar				~57 m	~70 m	80 m 92 m (towers)			Zaragoza	Spain	
Fatih Mosque		53 m	53 m	53 m			26 m	27.5 m	Istanbul	Turkey	
Cathedral-Basilica of the National Shrine of Our Lady Aparecida		52.86 m	52.86 m			70 m 109 m (clock tower)			Aparecida	Brazil	The largest cathedral (church with seat of a bishop) and second largest church building in the world.
Missouri State Capitol		52.12 m	52.12 m	~67 m	~76 m	79.25 m		~24 m	Jefferson City, Missouri	United States	
Timisoara Orthodox Cathedral		52 m	52 m	(no outer dome)	76 m	83 m			Timisoara	Romania	The second tallest church building in Romania.
Kronstadt Naval Cathedral		52 m	52 m			70.5 m			Kronstadt	Russia	
Cappella dei Principi		~52 m	~56 m	~59 m	61.80 m	~67 m			Florence	Italy	
The O2		52m	52m	~52 m	~52 m	100 m	365 m	~365 m	London	United Kingdom	Originally built as the Millennium Dome to house the Millennium Experience, a major exhibition to celebrate the turn of the Millennium. After the exhibition the dome was redeveloped and opened as The O2 arena venue and entertainment complex in 2005. It is amongst the largest buildings by volume in the world.
Novocherkassk Cathedral		51.2 m	51.2 m			74.7 m			Novocherkassk	Russia	
St. Stephen's Basilica		~51 m	~51 m	~75 m	~89 m	96 m			Budapest	Hungary	
Kansas State Capitol		~51 m	~51 m	~73 m	86.51 m	93.27 m			Topeka	United States	
Trinity Cathedral		~51 m	~51 m	~64 m	~74 m	80 m			Saint Petersburg	Russia	
Basilica of Superga		~51 m	~63 m	~59 m	~70 m	75 m			Turin	Italy	
Santissima Annunziata Maggiore				~58 m	67 m	~71 m			Naples	Italy	
Süleymaniye Mosque		~51 m	~51 m	53 m	53 m	~59 m 76 m (minarets)	26 m	27 m	Istanbul	Turkey	
Pisa Baptistery						54.86 m			Pisa	Italy	
Washington State Capitol		50.29 m	50.29 m	~72 m	~86 m	87.48 m		29 m	Olympia	United States	Tallest free-standing masonry dome in North America.
Utah State Capitol		50.29 m	50.29 m	~66 m	~74.5 m	76.20 m			Salt Lake City	United States	
Basilica of San Gaudenzio		~50 m ^{[α]} ~84 m ^{[β]}	~84 m	~85 m	121 m	126 m			Novara	Italy	
San Francisco City Hall		~50 m ^{[α]} 55.93 m ^{[β]}	55.93 m	~70 m	~83 m	93.73 m			San Francisco	United States	
El Capitolio						91.73 m			Havana	Cuba	
Basilica of Sainte-Thérèse (Lisieux)		50 m	50 m		88.3 m	90 m			Lisieux	France	
St. Nicholas Church		~50 m		~63 m	~72 m	77 m			Potsdam	Germany	
Georgia State Capitol		50 m	50 m	60 m	71.27 m	79.12 m	15 m	19 m	Atlanta	United States	
Basilica on the Holy Mountain				50 m	60 m			17 m	Głogówko	Poland	
Rhode Island State House		49.99 m		~60 m	67.36 m	71.63 m		~15 m	Providence	United States	
Rotunda of Xewkija				~54 m	72.24 m	74.68 m	24.99 m	27.43 m	Xewkija	Malta	
Basilica of the National Shrine of the Immaculate Conception		48.46 m	48.46 m	~63 m	~70 m	~76 m			Washington, DC	United States	
Sabancı Central Mosque				54 m	54 m			32 m	Adana	Turkey	
St. Nicholas Church (Malá Strana)			57 m	~62 m	~72 m	79 m			Prague	Czech Republic	
Iowa State Capitol		46.69 m ^{[α]} 53.47 m ^{[β]}	53.47 m	~65 m	75.90 m	83.82 m			Des Moines	United States	
Speyer Cathedral		46.40 m	46.40 m	58 m	58 m				Speyer	Germany	World's largest Romanesque church.
Almudena Cathedral				~54 m	~67 m	73 m			Madrid	Spain	
Royal Chapel of the Treasure of St. Januarius		~46 m	~46 m	~51 m	~57 m	~60 m			Naples	Italy	
Peterskirche (Vienna)		~46 m	56.8 m	~48 m	~57.5 m	~59 m			Vienna	Austria	
San Francesco di Paola		~46 m			53 m				Naples	Italy	
United States Capitol dome		~45.4 m ^{[α]} 54.94 m ^{[β]}	54.94 m	65.11 m	81.72 m	87.62 m			Washington, D.C.	United States	
Annunciation Cathedral					59 m	80 m (bell tower)			Kharkiv	Ukraine	
Church of St. Casimir					55.6 m	58 m			Vilnius	Lithuania	
Kocatepe Mosque		44.85 m	44.85 m	44.85 m		88 m (minarets)			Ankara	Turkey	
Pisa Cathedral		~44.7 m	~44.7 m	~46 m	~46 m	51.3 m			Pisa	Italy	
Palau Nacional		~44 m	~44 m	~60 m	~69 m	~76 m			Barcelona	Spain	
Cathedral Basilica of Saint Louis		44 m				69 m			St. Louis	United States	
Cathedral Basilica of Saints Peter and Paul				47.75 m	58.32 m	63.7 m			Philadelphia	United States	
Madonna dell'Umiltà						59 m			Pistoia	Italy	
Pantheon		43.44 m	43.44 m	45.60 m	45.60 m	45.60 m			Rome	Italy	
Oudenbosch Basilica				51 m		63 m			Oudenbosch	Netherlands	
Holy Trinity Cathedral (Arad)				50.7 m	50.7 m	58 m			Arad	Romania	
Selimiye Mosque		43 m	43 m	43 m		83 m (minarets)		31.2 m	Edirne	Turkey	
Centennial Hall		42 m	42 m					69 m	Wroclaw	Poland	Concrete dome with diameter of 69 m.
Desert Dome		41.75 m	41.75 m					70.1 m	Omaha, Nebraska	United States	The dome contains the largest indoor desert and is the largest geodesic glazed dome in the world.
Sultan Ahmed Mosque (Blue Mosque)				43 m	43 m		23.5 m	24.5 m	Istanbul	Turkey	
Buenos Aires Metropolitan Cathedral		41 m							Buenos Aires	Argentina	
Royal Albert Hall		~41 m	~41 m	~45 m	~48 m	~48 m	66.7 m	82.9 m	London	United Kingdom	
Basilica of San Francisco el Grande			58 m			~72 m		33 m	Madrid	Spain	The largest church dome in Spain and one of the largest by diameter (33 m) in Christendom.
Karlskirche		40 m				70 m			Vienna	Austria	
Alexander Nevsky Cathedral		40 m	40 m	46.3 m	46.3 m (50.52 m bell tower)	48.8m (2.5 m cross)		18 m	Sofia	Bulgaria	The largest cathedral in the Balkans.
Worms Cathedral		40 m	40 m						Worms	Germany	
Hazrat Sultan Mosque						51 m			Nur-Sultan	Kazakhstan	The largest domed mosque in Kazakhstan.
Ananta Samakhom Throne Hall		~40 m				49.5 m			Bangkok	Thailand	
West Baden Springs Hotel		39.62 m	39.62 m					59.4 m	West Baden Springs	United States	Steel and glass dome with diameter of 59.44 m.
St. Charles Borromeo Cemetery Church		39 m	39 m			58.5 m			Vienna	Austria	
Notre-Dame-du-Cap Basilica		38 m				78.64 m			Trois-Rivieres	Canada	
State Farm Center		38 m	38 m					120 m	Champaign	United States	Concrete dome with diameter of 120 m
Duomo of Barcellona Pozzo di Gotto		~38 m							Barcellona Pozzo di Gotto	Italy	
Transfiguration Cathedral (Odesa)				43.59 m	43.59 m	50.90 m 77.11 m (belfry)			Odesa	Ukraine	
Church of the Sacred Heart of Jesus						44 m			Vilnius	Lithuania	
Palace of the Argentine National Congress				~74 m	80 m (up to the chimerical figures on the crown)	~95 m			Buenos Aires	Argentina	
Dresden Frauenkirche		36.65 m ^{[α]} ~60 m ^{[β]}	~67 m	~62 m	~87 m	91.23 m			Dresden	Germany	
Our Lady of Victory Basilica		36.5 m	36.5 m			50.3 m			Lackawanna	United States	
Saint-Pierre-le-Jeune Catholic Church		~36 m	~36 m				18.5		Strasbourg	France	Dome diameter (inner) of 18.5 m.
Saint Blaise Abbey		36 m	36 m	50 m		63 m		36 m	St. Blasien	Germany	The largest dome by diameter (36 m) north of the Alps.
Church of St. Peter and St. Paul		35 m	40 m						Vilnius	Lithuania	
Basilica of St. Josaphat						61 m			Milwaukee	United States	
Victoria Memorial (Kolkata)						56 m			Kolkata	India	
Gol Gumbaz						51 m			Vijayapura	India	
San Lorenzo						50 m			Turin	Italy	
New Mosque				36 m	36 m			17.5 m	Istanbul	Turkey	
Shehzade Mosque				37 m	37 m	38 m	19 m		Istanbul	Turkey	
St. Gereon's Basilica		34.55 m	34.55 m	(no outer dome)	~46 m	~49 m			Cologne	Germany	
Nebraska State Capitol		34.14 m (Rotunda dome) 21.34 m (Memorial Chamber dome)	34.14 m	110.03 m	110.03 m	121.92 m		~14 m	Lincoln	United States	
Bojangles' Coliseum		34.14 m	34.14 m					101 m	Charlotte	United States	Tin dome with diameter of 101 m.
Siena Cathedral						48 m 77 m (bell tower)			Siena	Italy	
Federal Palace of Switzerland		33 m	33 m	~55 m	~61 m	64 m			Bern	Switzerland	
The First Church of Christ, Scientist		~33 m		~54 m		68 m			Boston	United States	
St Demetrius Cathedral		33 m	33 m	~39 m	~39 m	~45 m			Vidin	Bulgaria	The third tallest church dome in the Balkans. The second largest church building in Bulgaria.
Florence Baptistery						40 m			Florence	Italy	
Church of Our Lady of the Sign		32.2 m	32.2 m						Vilnius	Lithuania	
Indiana Statehouse		32.00 m	32.00 m	~61 m	71.63 m	~84 m	21.95 m		Indianapolis	United States	
Szeged Synagogue		32 m	32 m			48.6 m			Szeged	Hungary	The second largest synagogue in Hungary and the fourth largest in the world.
Liverpool Town Hall		32 m							Liverpool	United Kingdom	
Port of Liverpool Building				~58 m	~65 m	67.06 m		~15 m	Liverpool	United Kingdom	
Belgrade Fair - Hall 1		30.78 m	30.78 m					109 m	Belgrade	Serbia	The largest by diameter (109 m) dome in Europe. World's largest prestressed concrete dome.
New Town Hall (Hanover)		~30 m	~30 m	~71 m	~88 m	97.73 m			Hanover	Germany	
Nusretiye Mosque		29 m	29 m						Istanbul	Turkey	
Green Dome		27.85 m	27.85 m	27 m originally 30.2 m	27 m originally 30.2	33.2 m			Medina	Kingdom of Saudi Arabia	
Tempio Canoviano		27.82 m							Possagno	Italy	
Church of San Manuel y San Benito		~27.5 m	~32 m	~29 m	~36 m	~39 m 43 m (tower)			Madrid	Spain	
Hungarian Parliament Building		27 m ~31 m (space below the outer dome)	27 m	~73 m	~89 m	96 m			Budapest	Hungary	
Golghar						29 m		~32 m	Patna	India	
Taj Mahal		~25 m ~27 m (space below the outer dome)	~25 m	~64 m	~64 m	73 m		17.6 m	Agra	India	
Christuskirche				~62 m	~74 m	80 m			Mainz	Germany	
Holy Trinity Cathedral (Sibiu)		24.7 m	24.7 m	34.7 m	34.7 m	36.7 m 45 m (towers)			Sibiu	Romania	
Subotica Synagogue		23 m				40 m		12.6 m	Subotica	Serbia	
Novi Sad Synagogue						40 m 27 m(spire domes)		12m	Novi Sad	Serbia	
Basilica of St. Adalbert						46 m			Grand Rapids	United States	
Church of Holy Transfiguration, Pančevo				28.4 m	33.3 m	34.7 m 48.3 m (tower dome)	10.4 m		Pančevo	Serbia	
Natural History Museum					65 m	69 m			Vienna	Austria	

^{α} Height up to eye of the lower inner dome
^{β} Height up to the upper dome ceiling (excl. lantern)

== See also ==
- List of largest domes
- List of Roman domes
