= Pompeo Ferrari =

Italian architect (c. 1660–1736)

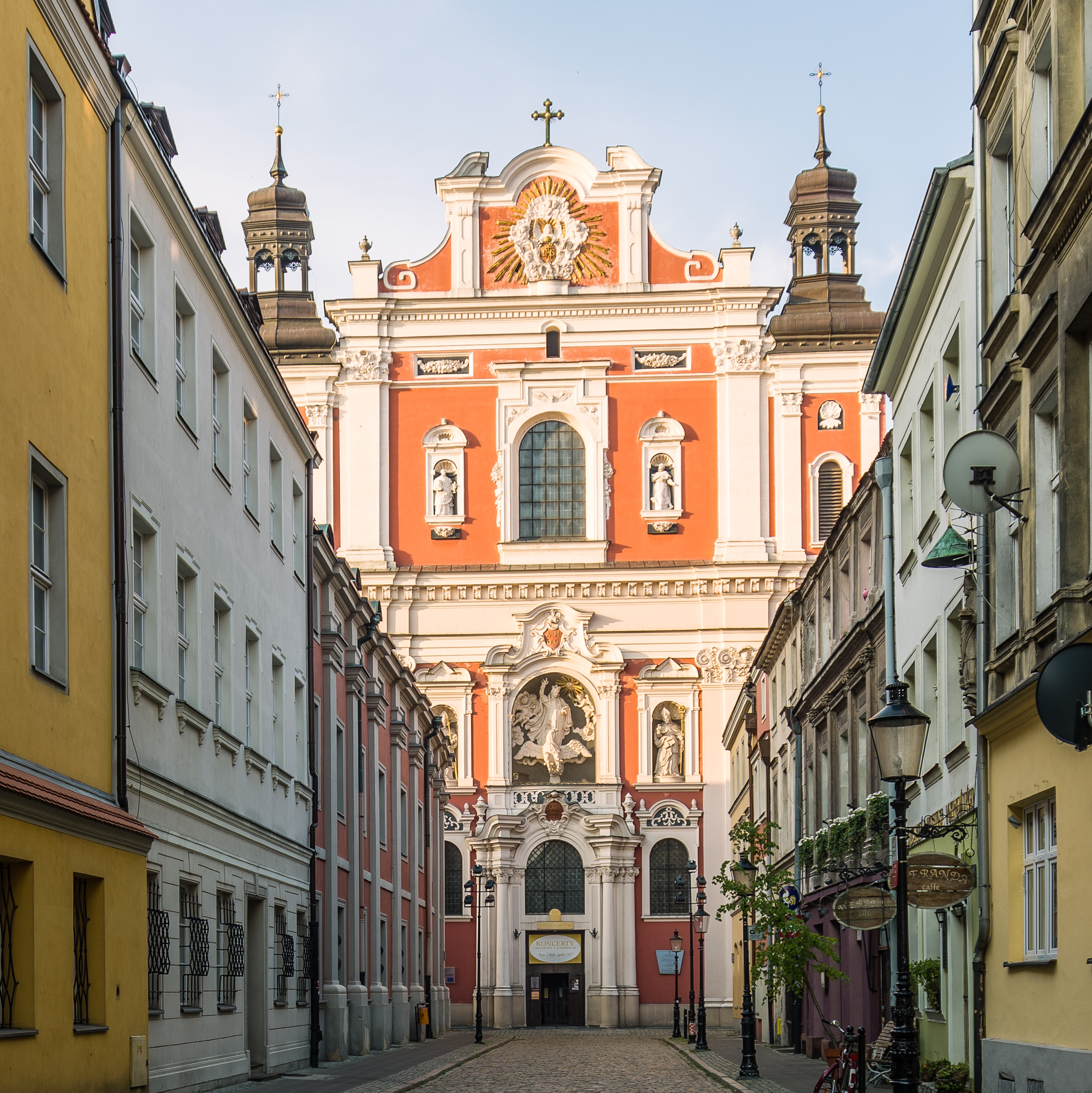
Fara Church in Poznań, Poland

Pompeo Ferrari (circa 1660 – 15 May 1736) was an Italian architect, known as the best Baroque artist of Greater Poland.

== Biography ==
He studied in the leading art school of the era – Accademia di San Luca in Rome. After 1696, he lived in the court of the king Stanislaus I Leszczyński in Rydzyna. In 1703 he married Anna Rozyna Eitner, with whom he had several children.

== Main works ==
- Leszno town hall (disputed) and tombs in the parish church
- Urban foundation of Rydzyna
- Ląd Abbey
- Basilica on the Holy Mountain near Gostyń
- Teodor Potocki's chapel at the Cathedral in Gniezno
- Fara Church in Poznań

== Bibliography ==
Dalbor, Witold. 1938. Pompeo Ferrari ok. 1660-1736: działalność architektoniczna w Polsce. Warszawa: Kasa Mianowskiego.
