= Głogówko, Greater Poland Voivodeship =

Głogówko
- Settlement
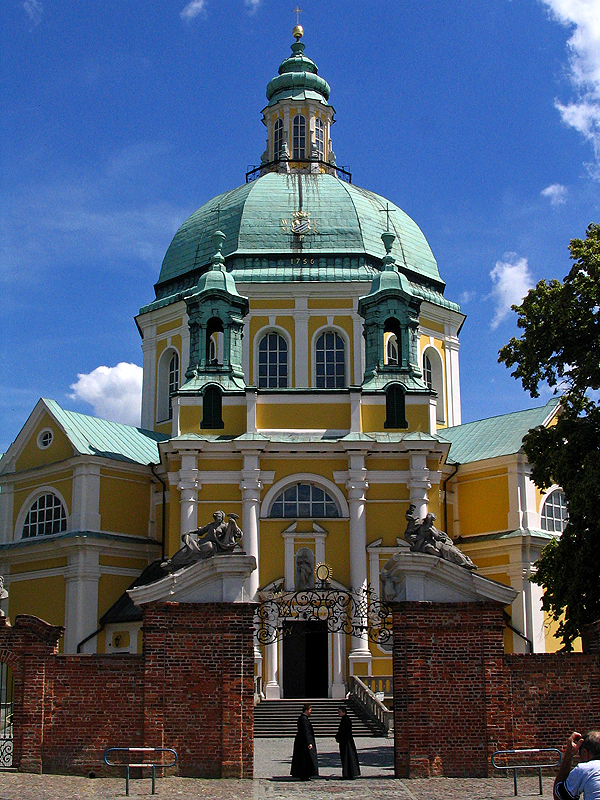
- Basilica on the Holy Mountain in Głogówko

- Location within Poland
- Coordinates: 51°53′9″N 17°2′7″E
- Country: Poland
- Voivodeship: Greater Poland
- County: Gostyń
- Gmina: Piaski

Głogówko [ɡwɔˈɡufkɔ] is a settlement in the administrative district of Gmina Piaski, within Gostyń County, Greater Poland Voivodeship, in west-central Poland.

== Holy Mountain Shrine ==
The basilica minor was modelled after Baldassare Longhena's Santa Maria della Salute in Venice and constructed by polonized Italians Jerzy Catenazzi, Jan Catenazzi and Pompeo Ferrari between 1675 and 1728. The church and monastery of the Oratory of Saint Philip Neri were established by Adam Konarzewski and completed by his wife Zofia Krystyna Opalińska. It is one of Poland's official Historic Monuments (Pomnik historii), as designated March 27, 2008, and tracked by the National Heritage Board of Poland.

== See also ==
- Basilica on the Holy Mountain, Głogówko
