= Poznań Fara =

Church in Poznań, Poland

The Minor Basilica of Our Lady of Perpetual Help in Poznań Fara
- Basilica of Our Lady of Perpetual Help, Mary Magdalene and Saint Stanislaus
- Fara Poznańska (Polish)
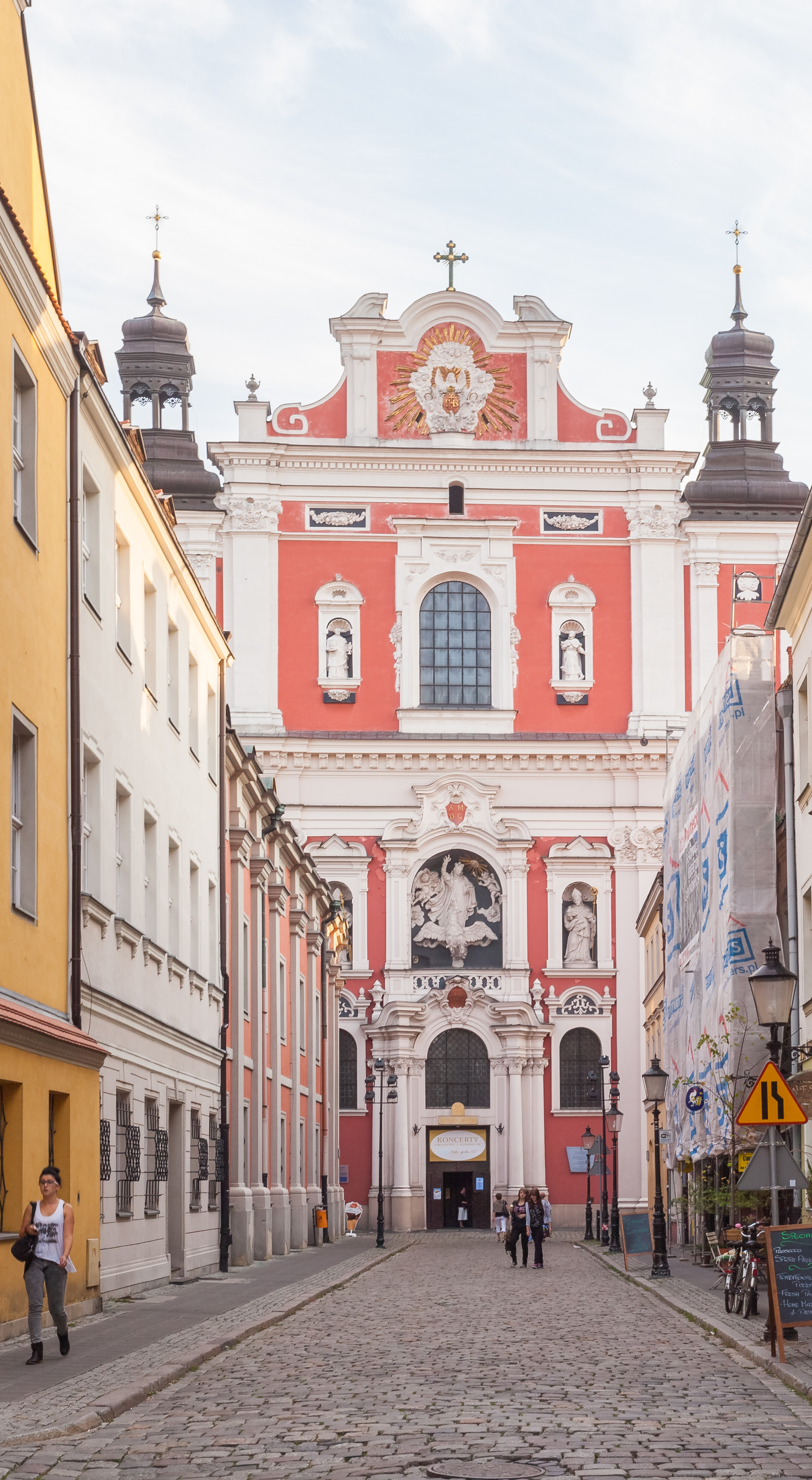
- Northern façade with main entrance
- The Minor Basilica of Our Lady of Perpetual Help in Poznań Fara
- 52°24′22″N 16°56′03″E
- Location: Gołębia Street, Poznań
- Country: Poland
- Denomination: Catholic Church
- Sui iuris church: Latin Church
- Website: fara.archpoznan.pl

History
- Status: Parish church and Basilica
- Dedication: Mary, mother of Jesus (The Most Holy Virgin Mary, Queen of Poland), Mary Magdalene, Saint Stanislaus
- Consecrated: 1705

Architecture
- Functional status: Active
- Architect(s): Bartłomiej Nataniel Wąsowski, Giovanni Catenazzi, Pompeo Ferrari
- Style: Baroque
- Years built: 1651–1701

Specifications
- Length: 55 m (180 ft)
- Height: 27 m (89 ft) (nave)

Administration
- Archdiocese: Poznań

The Basilica of Our Lady of Perpetual Help in Poznań Fara (Polish: Fara Poznańska), also informally known as the Poznan Fara, is a Catholic minor basilica located in Poznań Old Town district of Poland. The famed shrine is dedicated to the Blessed Virgin Mary and is one of the city's most recognizable historical landmarks, the most important Christian temple alongside the Poznań Cathedral and the finest example of Baroque architecture preserved within the country.

Its full name is the Basilica of Our Lady of Perpetual Help, Saints Mary Magdalene and Stanislaus of Szczepanów. It is currently part of the Latin Church Archdiocese of Poznań.

Built between 1651 and 1701, the structure was engineered by Polish and Italian masters in the Baroque style, who also incorporated Roman architectural aspects such as the monumental Composite columns in the interior. In the 18th century, the artisan Pompeo Ferrari designed the main altar standing at 17 meters in height and the main entrance from the Old Town. In 1876, an organ constructed by Friedrich Ladegast was installed inside the Church. The Fara, like most of the city, was spared from destruction during the Second World War.

Pope Benedict XVI raised the shrine to the status of Minor Basilica via decree on 17 June 2010.

== History ==
In 1570, Bishop Adam Konarski brought the Jesuits to Poznań, who were given permission to occupy the former Church of Saint Stanislaus. In 1651, the construction of a new temple began and the plans of which were probably sent from Rome (traditionally the author of the project was Bartłomiej Nataniel Wąsowski - rector of the Jesuit College in Poznań and theoretician of architecture). Initial work (until 1652) was directed by Italian-born Tomasz Poncino. The Swedish Deluge (1655-1660) suspended the work. In 1705, the Fara was consecrated, despite the Church being incomplete. In the years 1727-1732 Pompeo Ferrari remodelled the main entry and the interior, thus bringing the final phase of construction to an end.

Following the 1773 fire and the 1780 collapse of the nearby Mary Magdalene Collegiate Church, the Fara became the new seat of the Poznań clergy. In 1913, the entire complex was renovated; the work was cut short by World War I. During the Invasion of Poland and World War II, the Fara was spared but stripped of its rich ornaments and turned into a warehouse by the Wehrmacht. War damage was cleared by 1950.

== Alleged Phantasm ==
According to pious legend, a phantasmic woman dressed in black funeral garments appears on the hardly—accessible organ balcony. The ghost was sighted on many occasions, which was often featured in television media and news coverage.

The haunted woman is purported to have donated a large monetary sum to purchase the organ in the 1870s but was betrayed by her male romantic lover and became accursed to guarding the instrument due to heartbreak, which remains locked and off—limits to tourists.

== Gallery ==
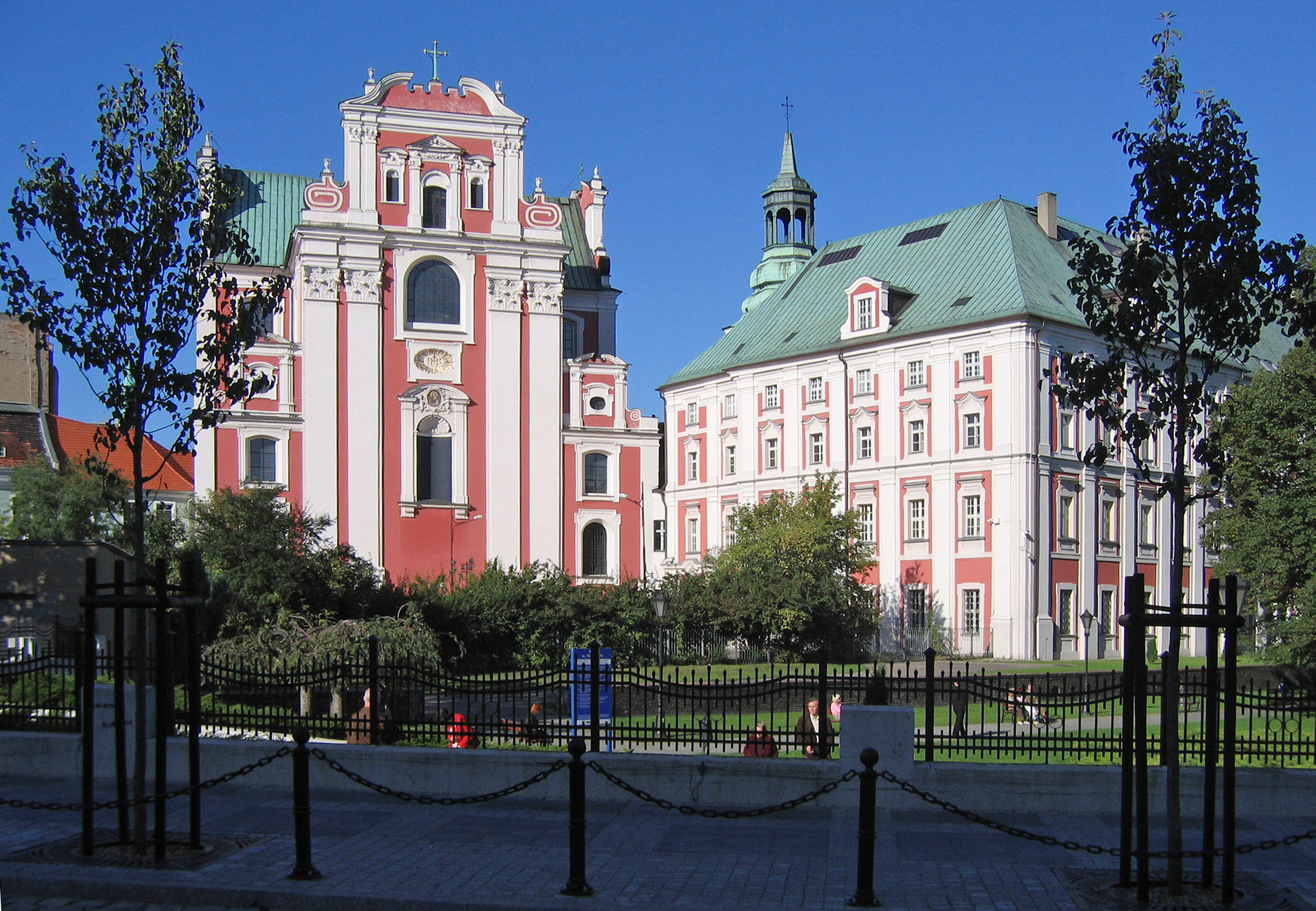
The Fara seen from the northern (rear) side

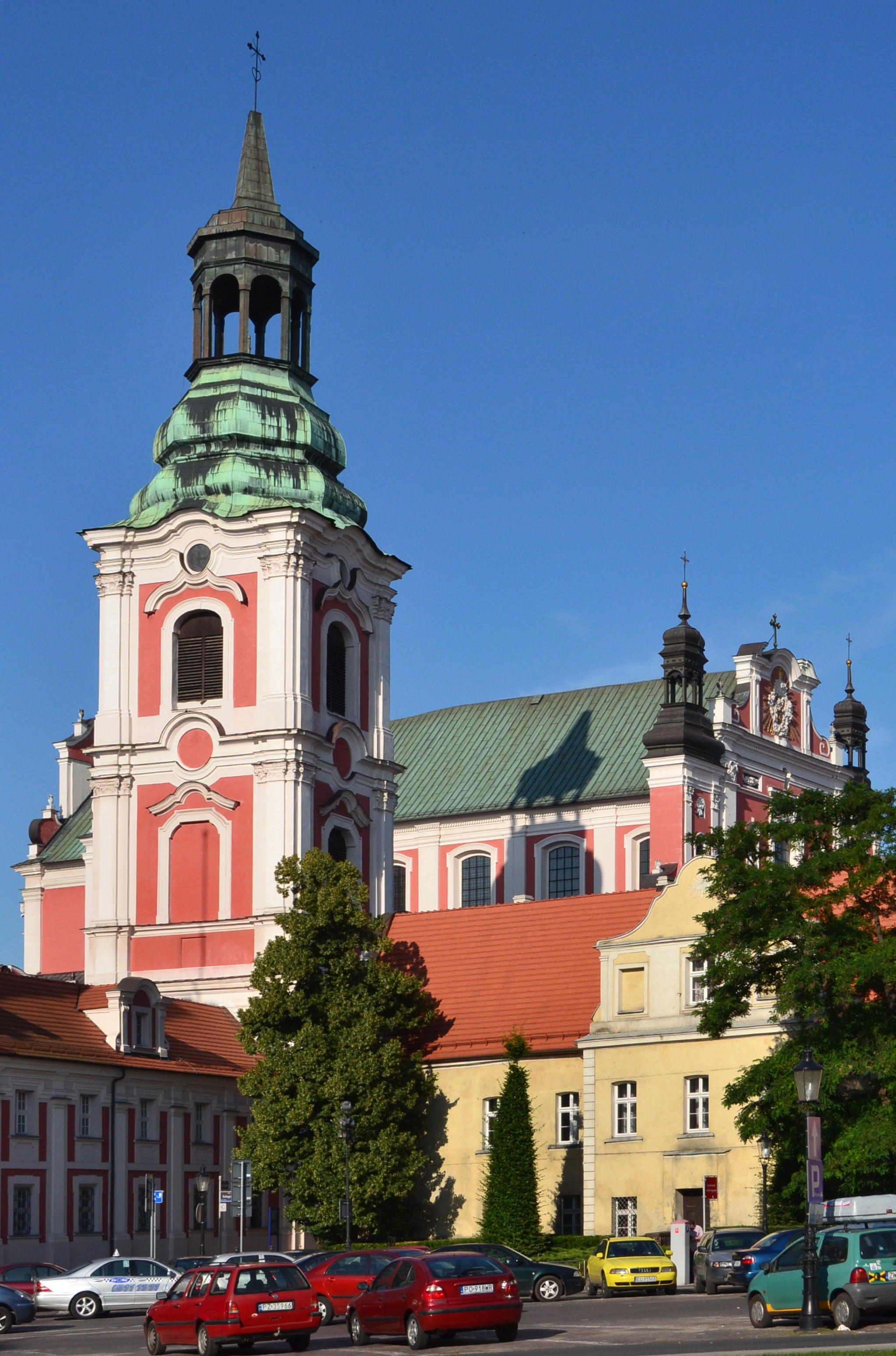
Main Tower near the college

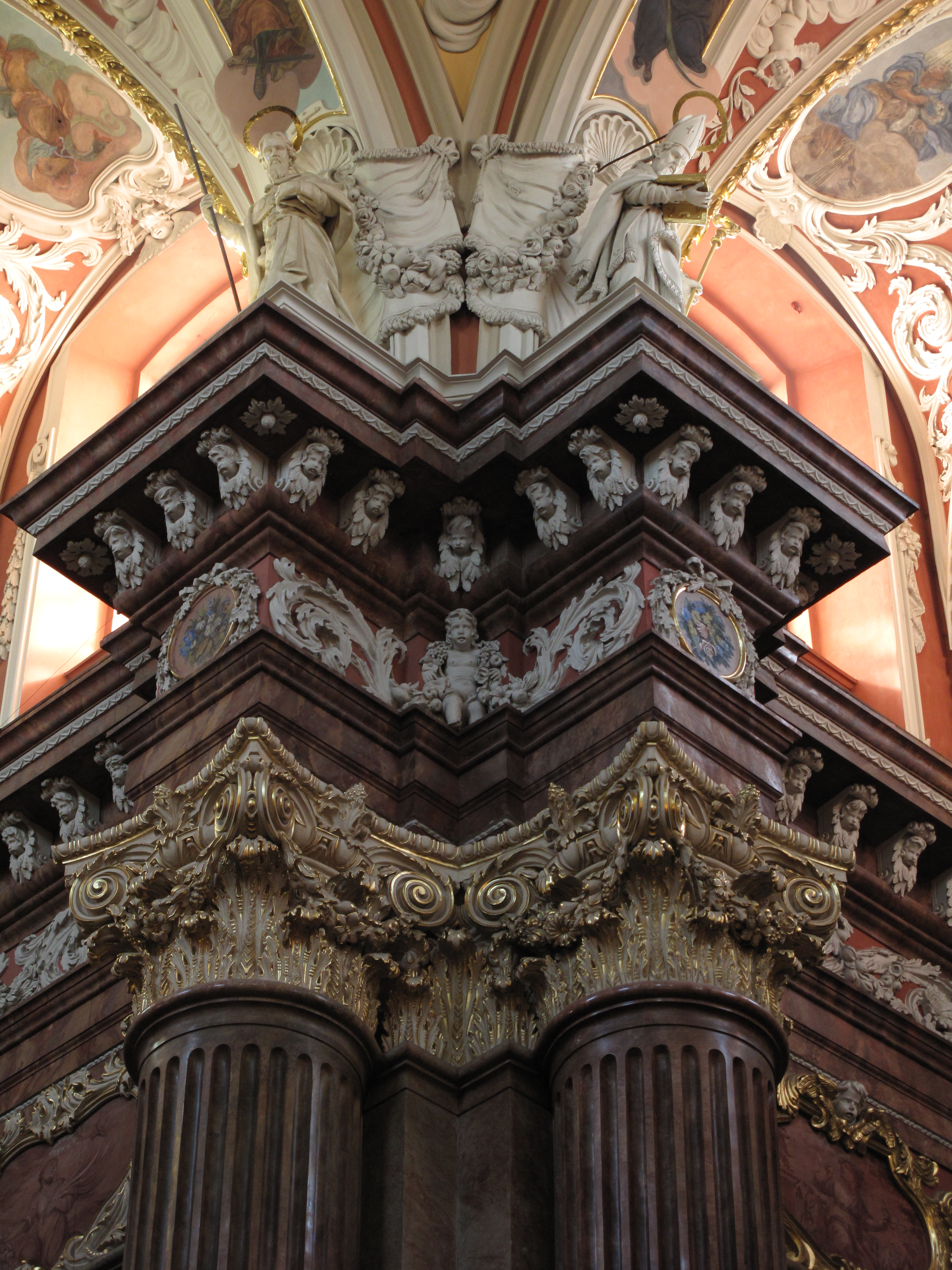
Composite columns and supportive pillars

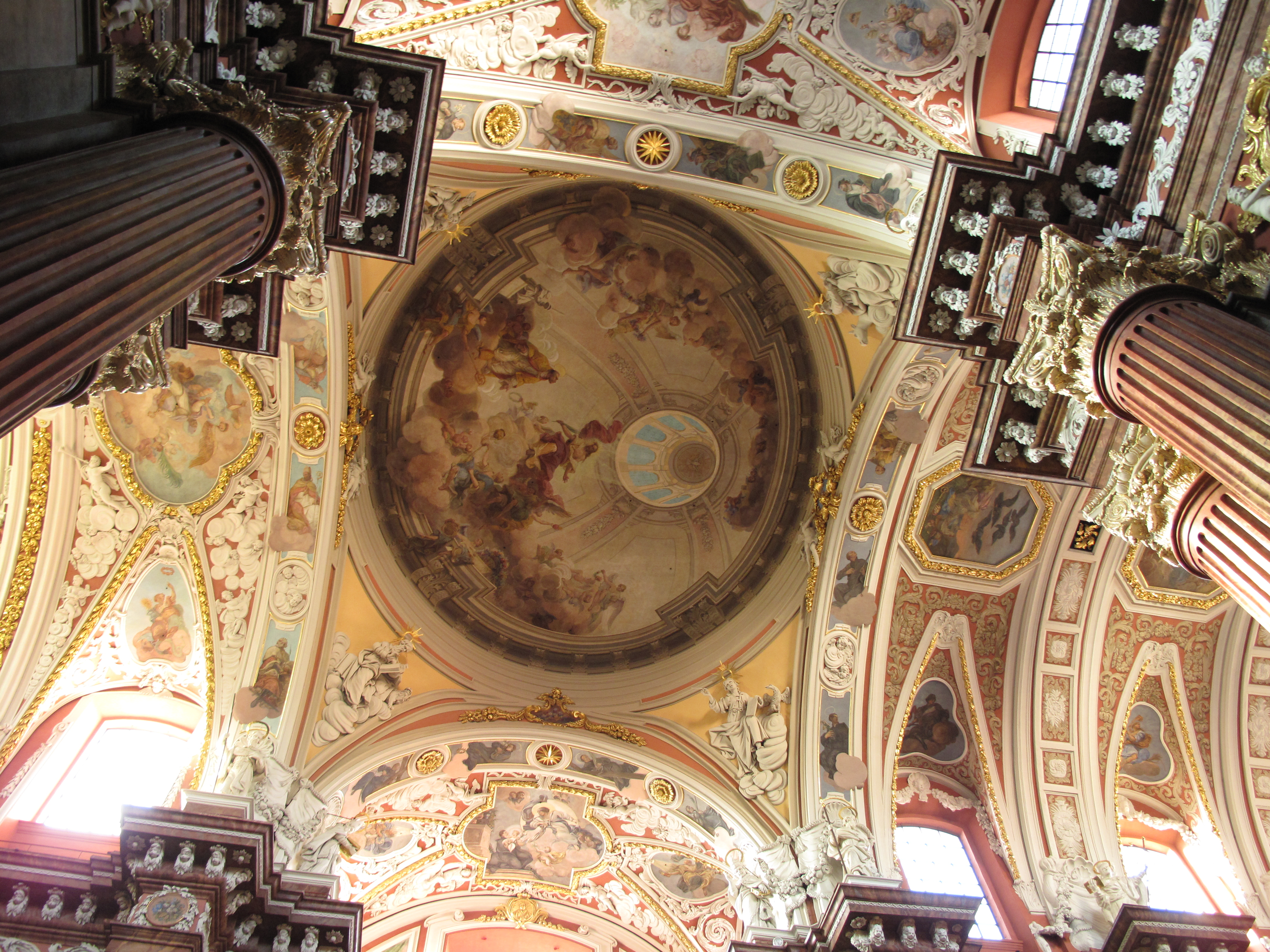
Copula fresco

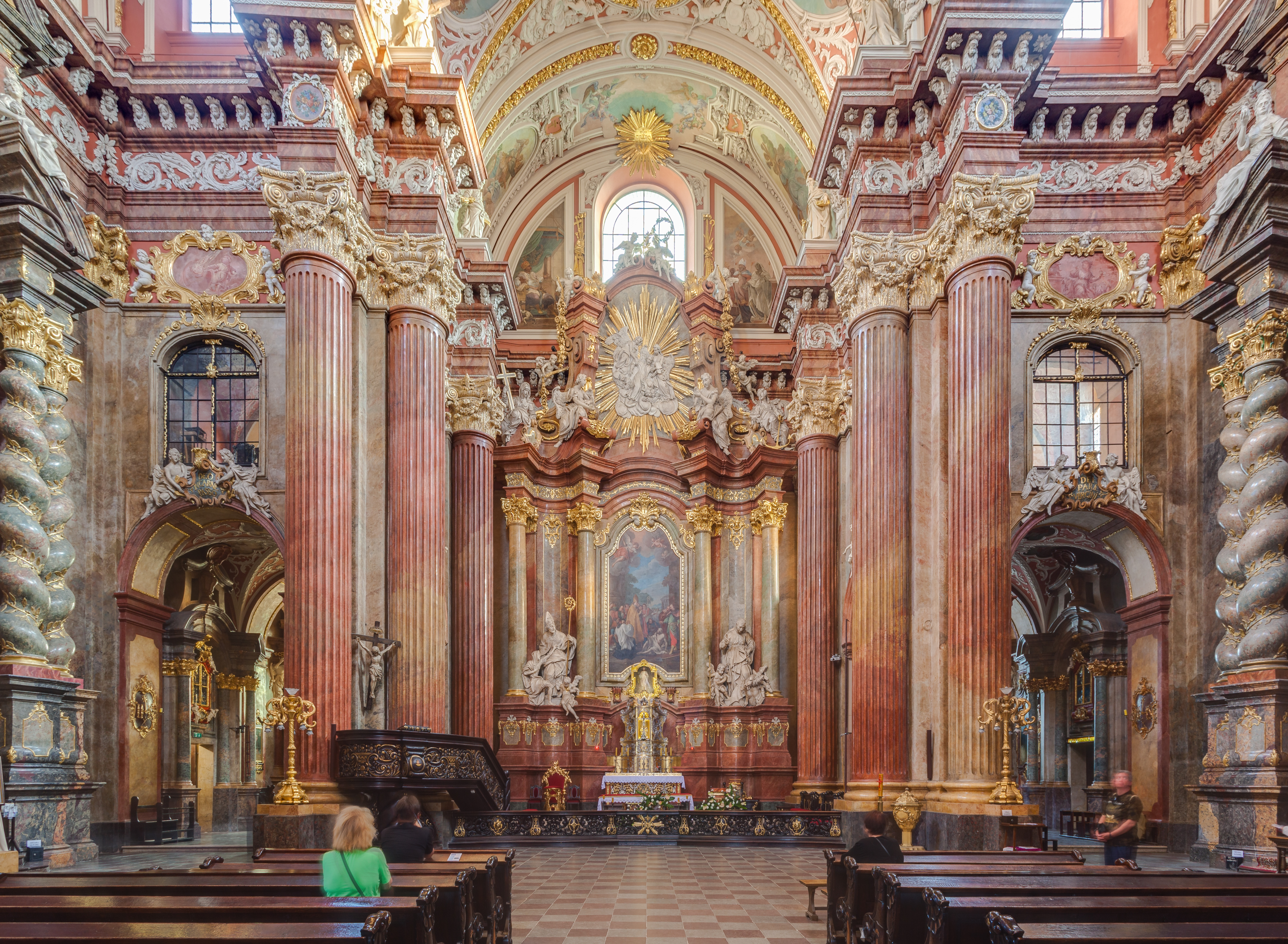
Interior of the church.

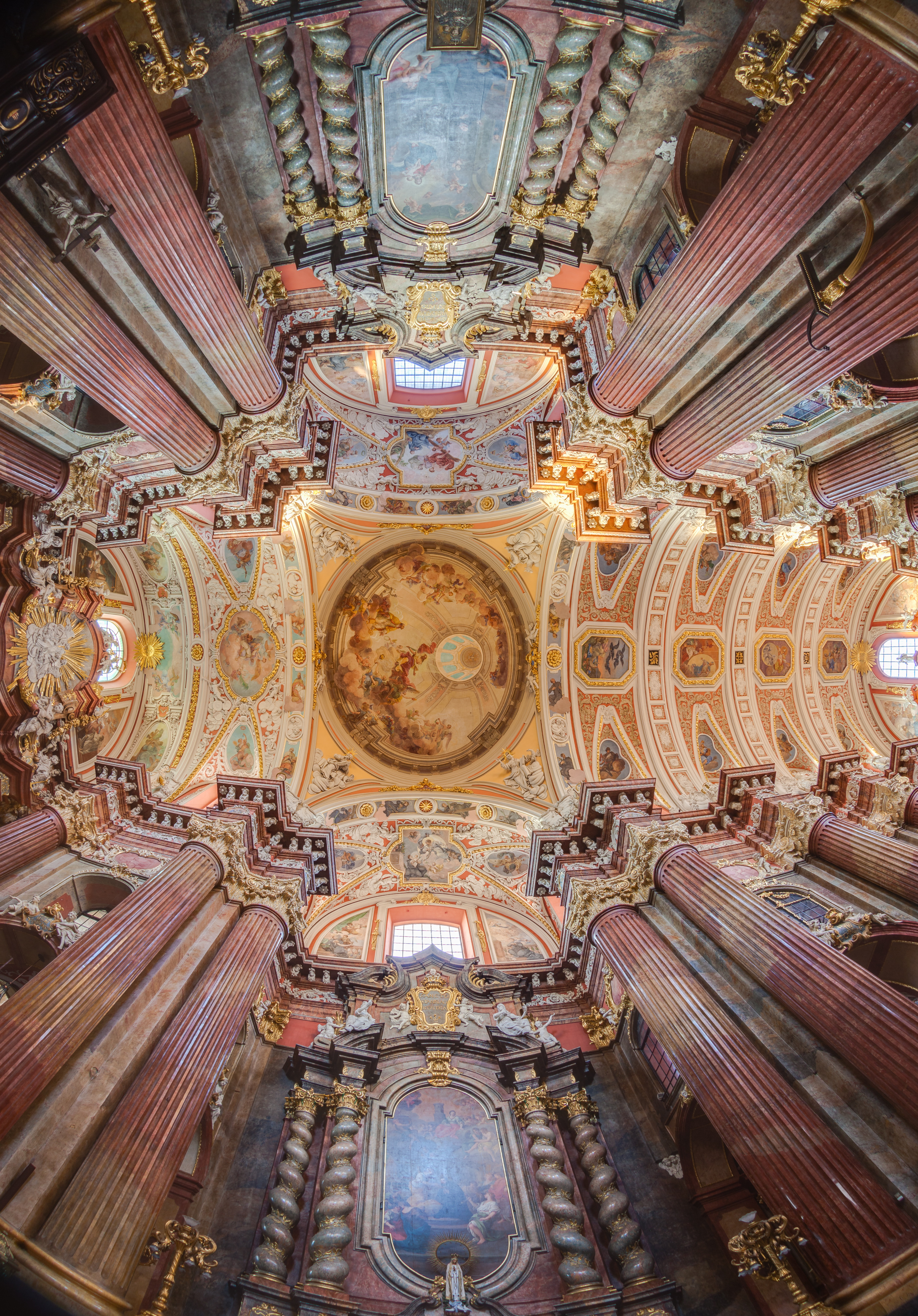
Interior of the church.

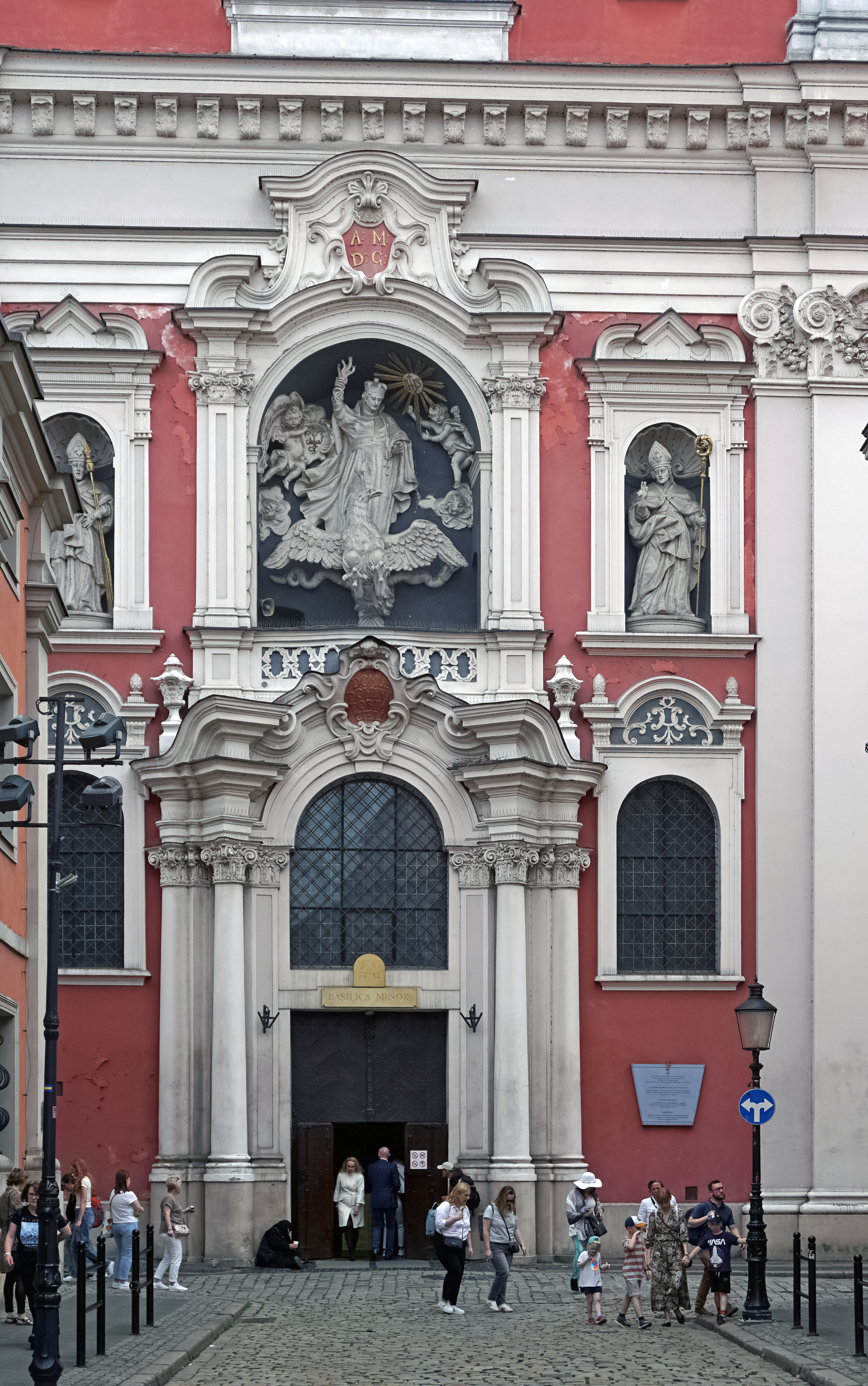
Entrance portal

== See also ==
- List of Jesuit sites
