= Oudenbosch railway station =

Railway station in Oudenbosch, Netherlands

Oudenbosch
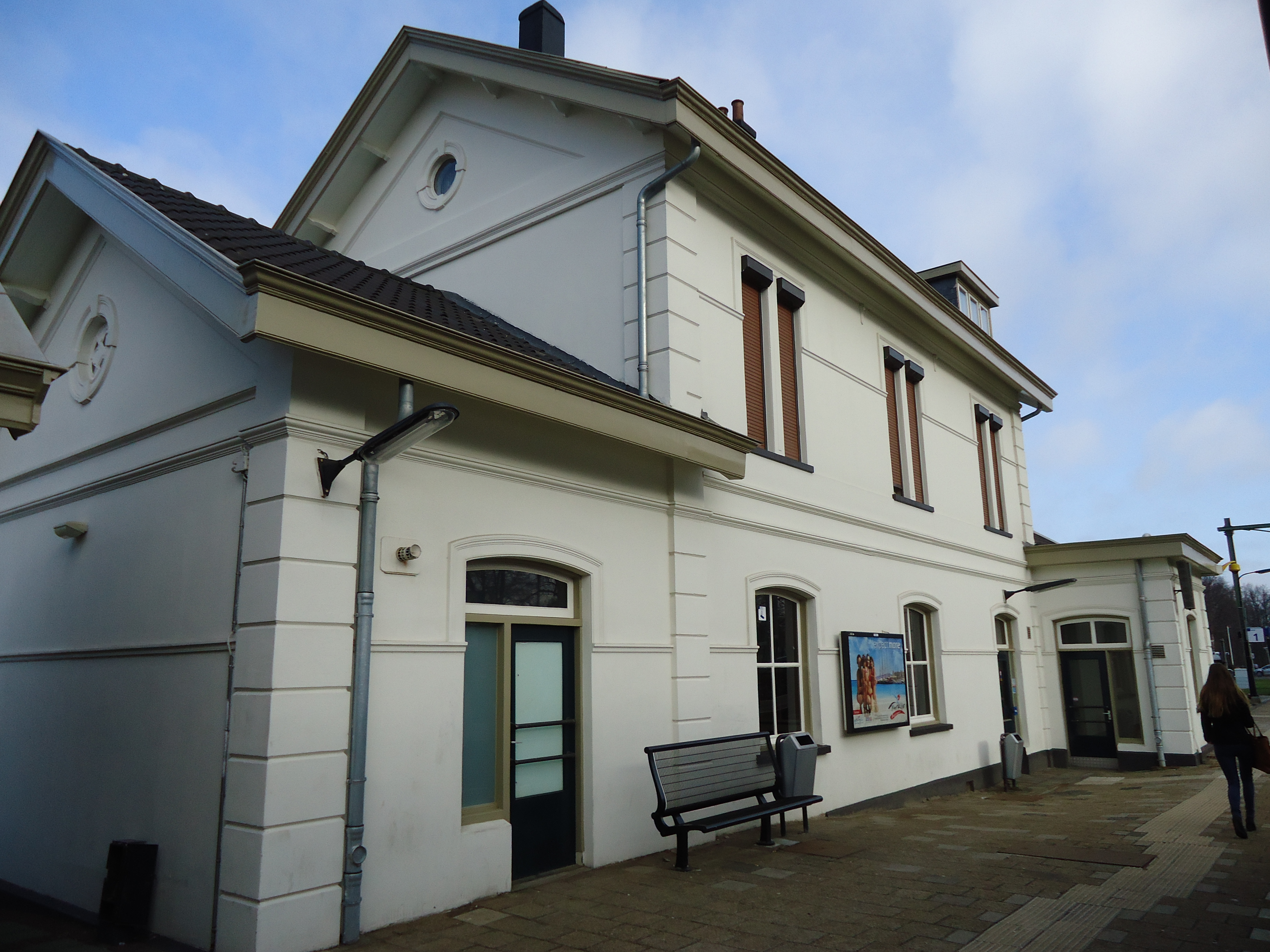

General information
- Location: Netherlands
- Coordinates: 51°35′17″N 4°32′01″E
- Line: Antwerp–Lage Zwaluwe railway

History
- Opened: 20 October 1854

Services
Preceding station	Nederlandse Spoorwegen	Following station
Zevenbergen towards Dordrecht	NS Sprinter 5900 2x/hour, but only 1x/hour on evenings and weekends	Roosendaal Terminus
Location
- Location within Netherlands

Oudenbosch is a railway station located in Oudenbosch, Netherlands. The station was opened on October 20, 1854, and is located on the Antwerp–Lage Zwaluwe railway. The train services are operated by Nederlandse Spoorwegen.

== Train services ==
The following services currently call at Oudenbosch:

- 2x per hour local service (Sprinter) Dordrecht - Roosendaal
