= Oudenbosch Basilica =

Catholic basilica in the Netherlands

The Oudenbosch Basilica
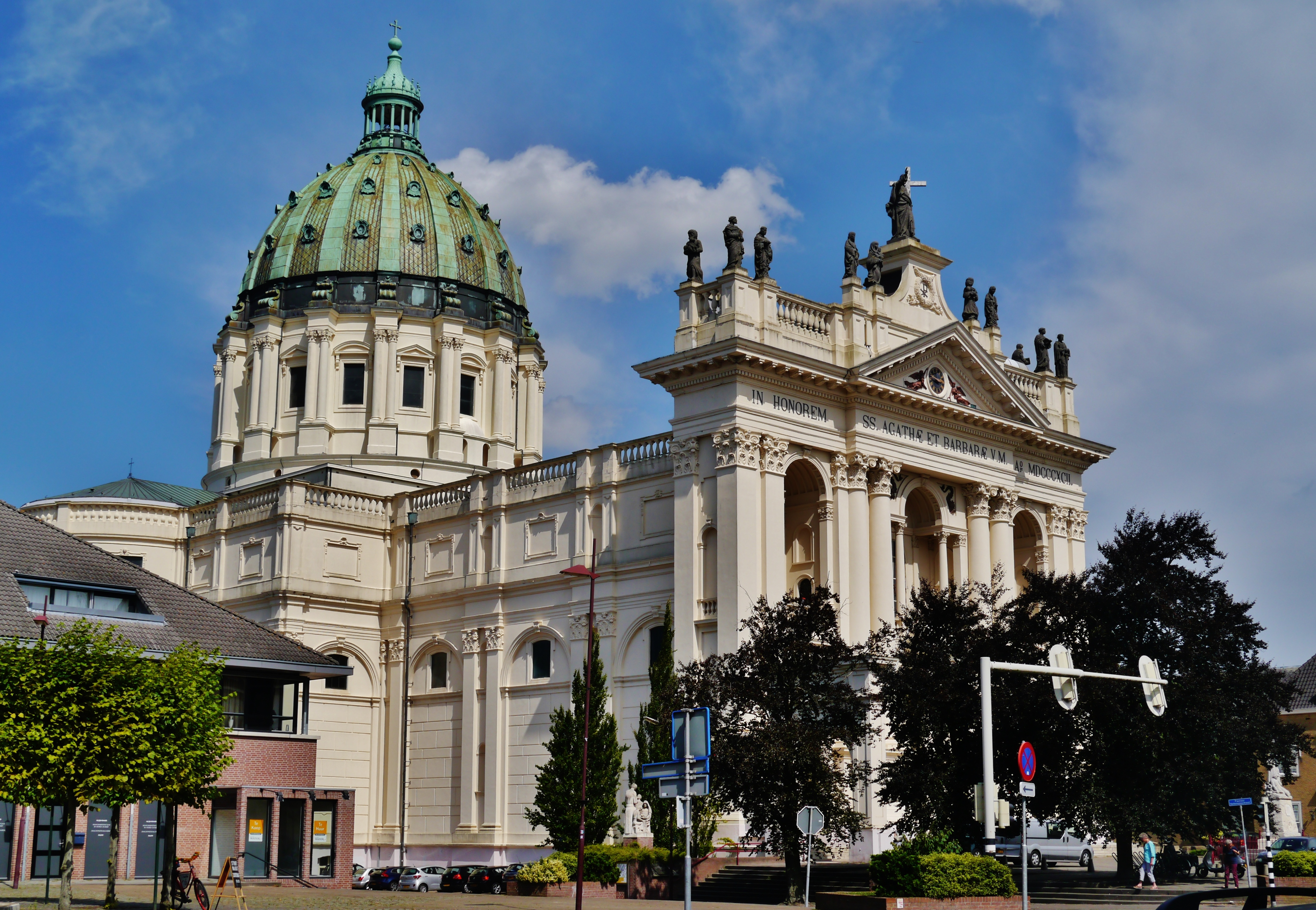
- Basilica of H.H. Agatha and Barbara

Religion
- Affiliation: Roman Catholic
- Province: North Brabant
- Ecclesiastical or organisational status: Basilica

Location
- Location: Oudenbosch, Netherlands
- Interactive map of The Oudenbosch Basilica
- Coordinates: 51°35′22″N 4°31′43″E

Architecture
- Architects: Dr. P. Cuypers, G.J. van Swaay
- Style: Neoclassicism
- Groundbreaking: 1865
- Completed: 1892

Specifications
- Length: 81 meters (265 ft 9.0 in)
- Width: 55 meters (180 ft 5.4 in)
- Height (max): 63 meters (206 ft 8.3 in)
- Dome height (outer): 51 meters (167 ft 3.9 in)
- Dome dia. (inner): 20 meters (65 ft 7.4 in)

Website
- http://www.basiliekoudenbosch.com/

The Oudenbosch Basilica is a Roman Catholic basilica in the Dutch village of Oudenbosch. The basilica is named after Agatha of Sicily and Barbara of Nicomedia, two Christian martyrs from the third century. It was built at the initiative of Willem Hellemons who was parish priest between 1842 and 1884. Its nave and interior were modeled after St. Peter's Basilica, while the facade is a replica of the Basilica of St. John Lateran, both located in Rome. The basilica was designed by architect Pierre Cuypers. Construction began in 1865 but was not fully completed until 1892. The basilica is unique in the region in that it is relatively large with a classical Italian appearance that is atypical for most of northern Europe, let alone a small town in North Brabant.

Dutch Papal Zouaves and local Catholics gathered in Oudenbosch and left for Rome in 1868 to defend the Papal State against Giuseppe Garibaldi's Italian nationalist army. Therefore Pope Pius IX agreed to build a relatively big basilica in a small place. Originally a church, it was designated a minor basilica in 1912. A piece of the cloak Pope John Paul II wore during the 1981 assassination attempt is kept there as a relic.

Elements inspired by their counterparts in Rome include Michelangelo's Pietà, Bernini's baldachin, the Chair of Saint Peter, and Bernini's Gloria.

== Gallery ==
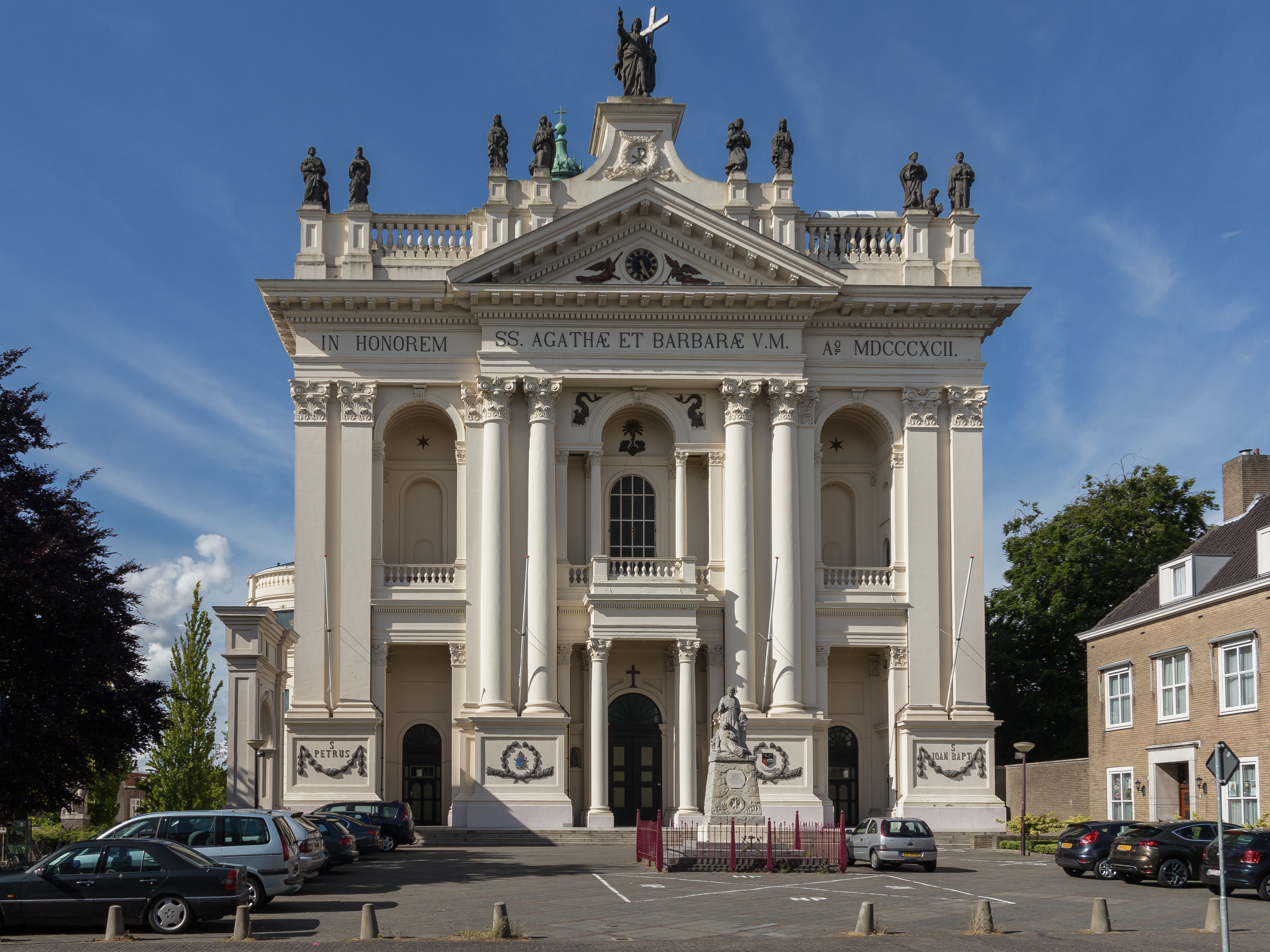

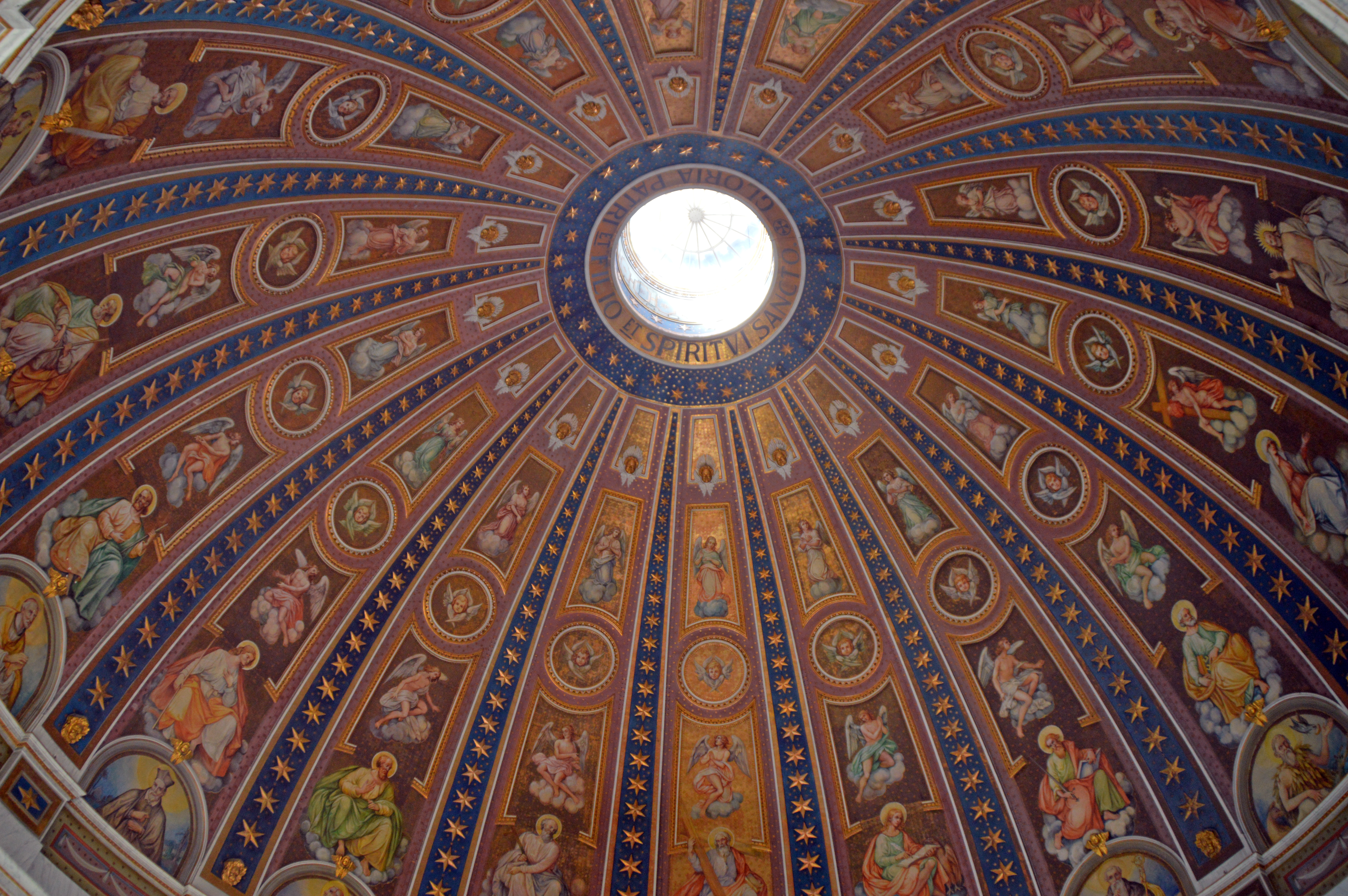
Dome

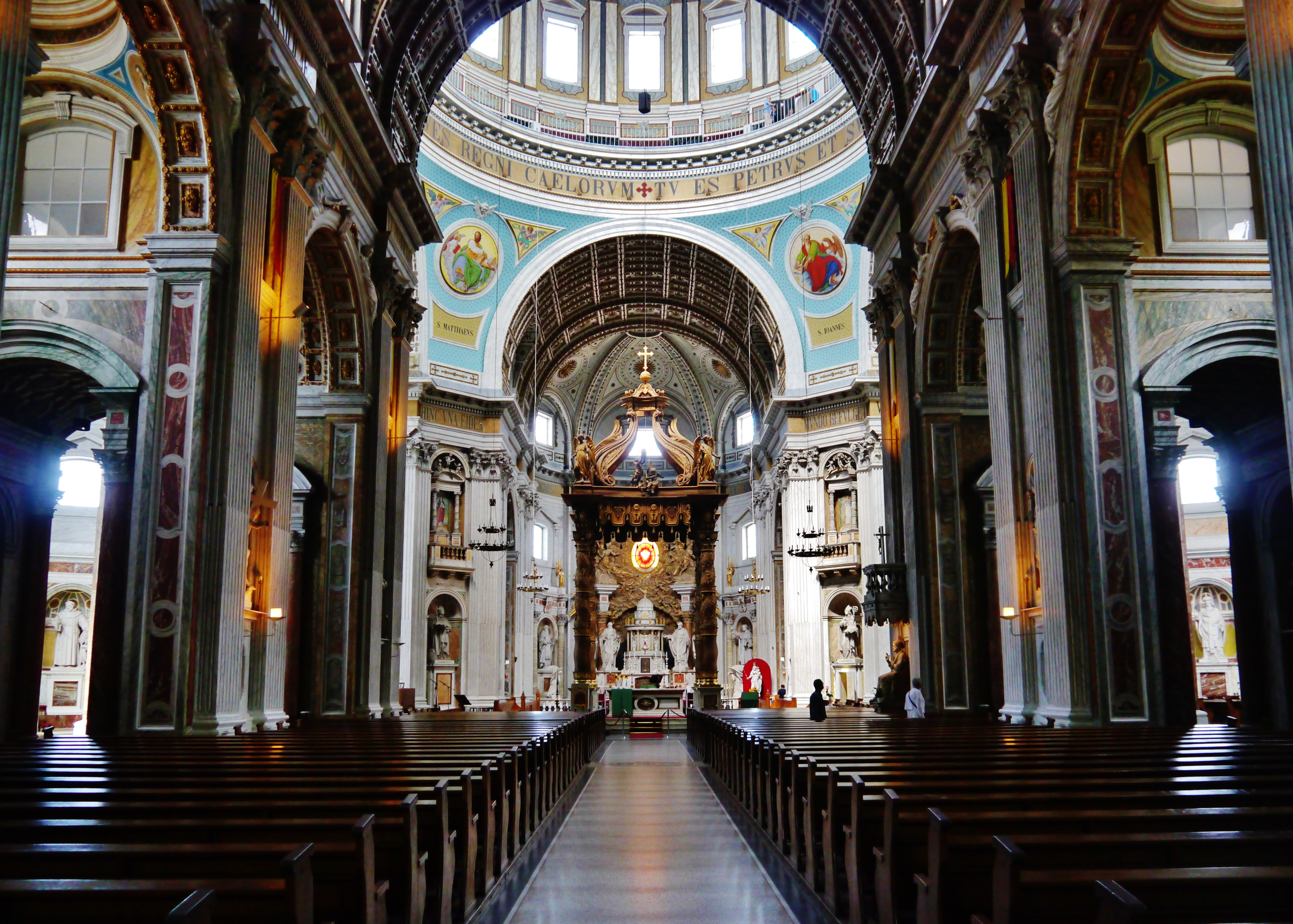
Interior of the Basilica

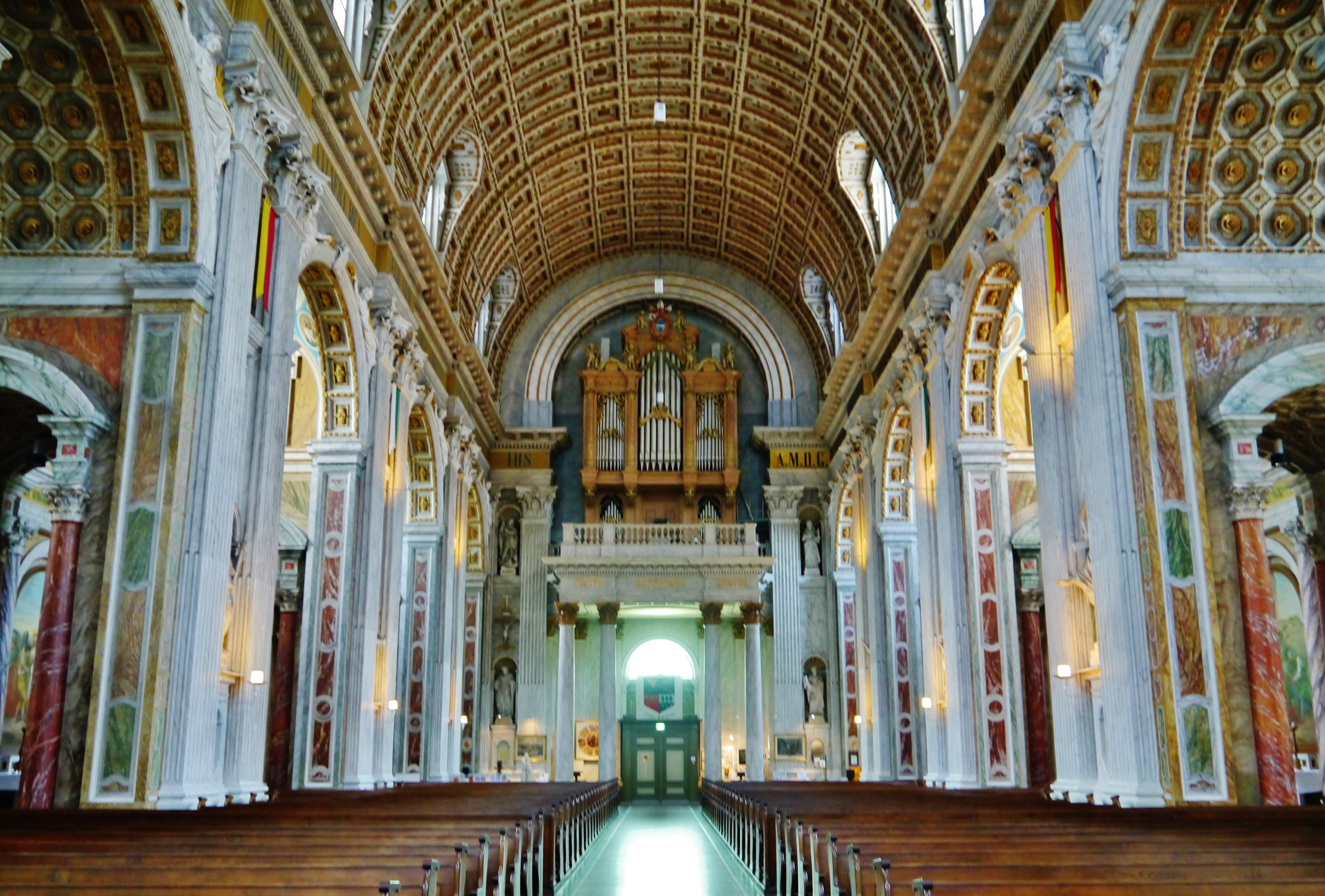
Interior of the Basilica with the pipe organ
