= Oudenbosch =

- Town
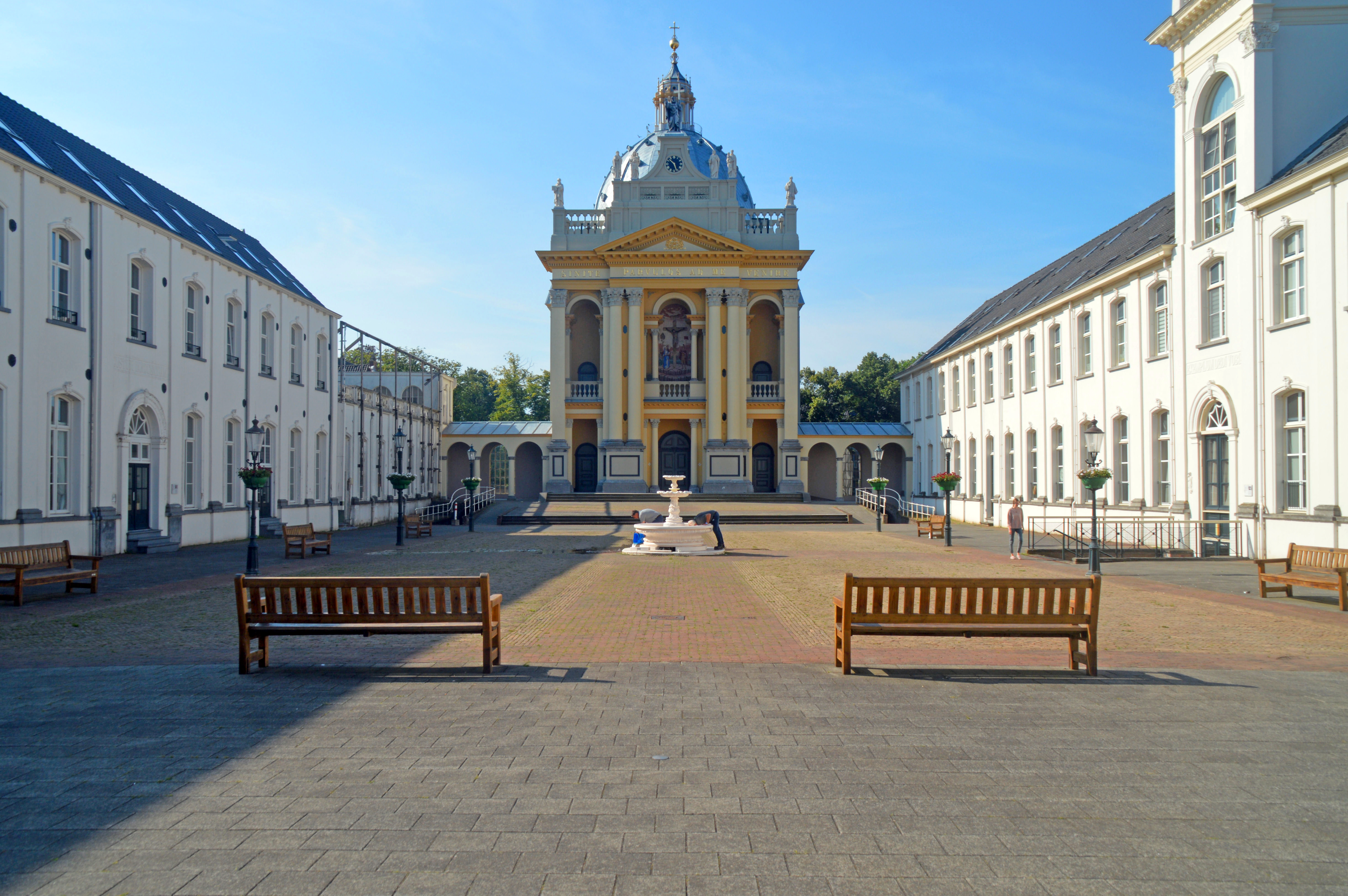
- Chapel Saint Louis

- Location in the province of North Brabant in the Netherlands Oudenbosch (Netherlands)
- Coordinates: 51°35′21″N 4°31′26″E
- Country: Netherlands
- Province: North Brabant
- Municipality: Halderberge

Area
  - Total: 22.44 km^{2} (8.66 sq mi)
- Elevation: 2.8 m (9.2 ft)

Population (2021)
  - Total: 13,380
  - Density: 596.3/km^{2} (1,544/sq mi)
- Time zone: UTC+1 (CET)
  - Summer (DST): UTC+2 (CEST)
- Postal code: 4731
- Dialing code: 0165

Oudenbosch (Dutch pronunciation: [ˌʌudə(m)ˈbɔs]) is a town in the municipality of Halderberge in the west of the Dutch province of North Brabant. Oudenbosch is well known for its 'Basiliek', a Catholic church that is a smaller copy of St. Peter's Basilica in Rome.

== History ==
The village was first mentioned in 1275 as "silvam que vocatur Barlebosche", and means "old forest". The forest was cultivated from 1275 onwards by the monks of the Cistercian abbey of St Bernard near Antwerp. The word Ouden (old) was added to the name to distinguish from Nieuwenbosch, a village which was lost in the St. Elizabeth's flood of 1421. Oudenbosch was located at an intersection of land and waterways which stimulated its development.

In 1837, the monastery boarding school St Anna was founded, and Oudenbosch became a Catholic centre. Oudenbosch was home to 1,945 people in 1840. In 1862, the first sugar factory was built in Oudenbosch, and it became a centre of the sugar industry.

The Oudenbosch Basilica was built between 1865 and 1880 as a replacement of the parish church. It was designed by Pierre Cuypers as a replica of St. Peter's Basilica, however the scale varies. The entrance was added in 1892 and is modeled after the Archbasilica of Saint John Lateran.

Oudenbosch railway station is on the Rotterdam–Antwerp line and was built in 1854. Oudenbosch was a separate municipality until 1997, when it became part of the new municipality of Halderberge.

== Transportation ==
- Railway station: Oudenbosch

== Notable people (born in Oudenbosch) ==
- Cornelis Andries Backer (1874–1963), botanist
- Jac. van Ginneken (1877–1945), linguist and Jesuit
- Marinus Jan Granpré Molière (1883–1972), architect

== Gallery ==
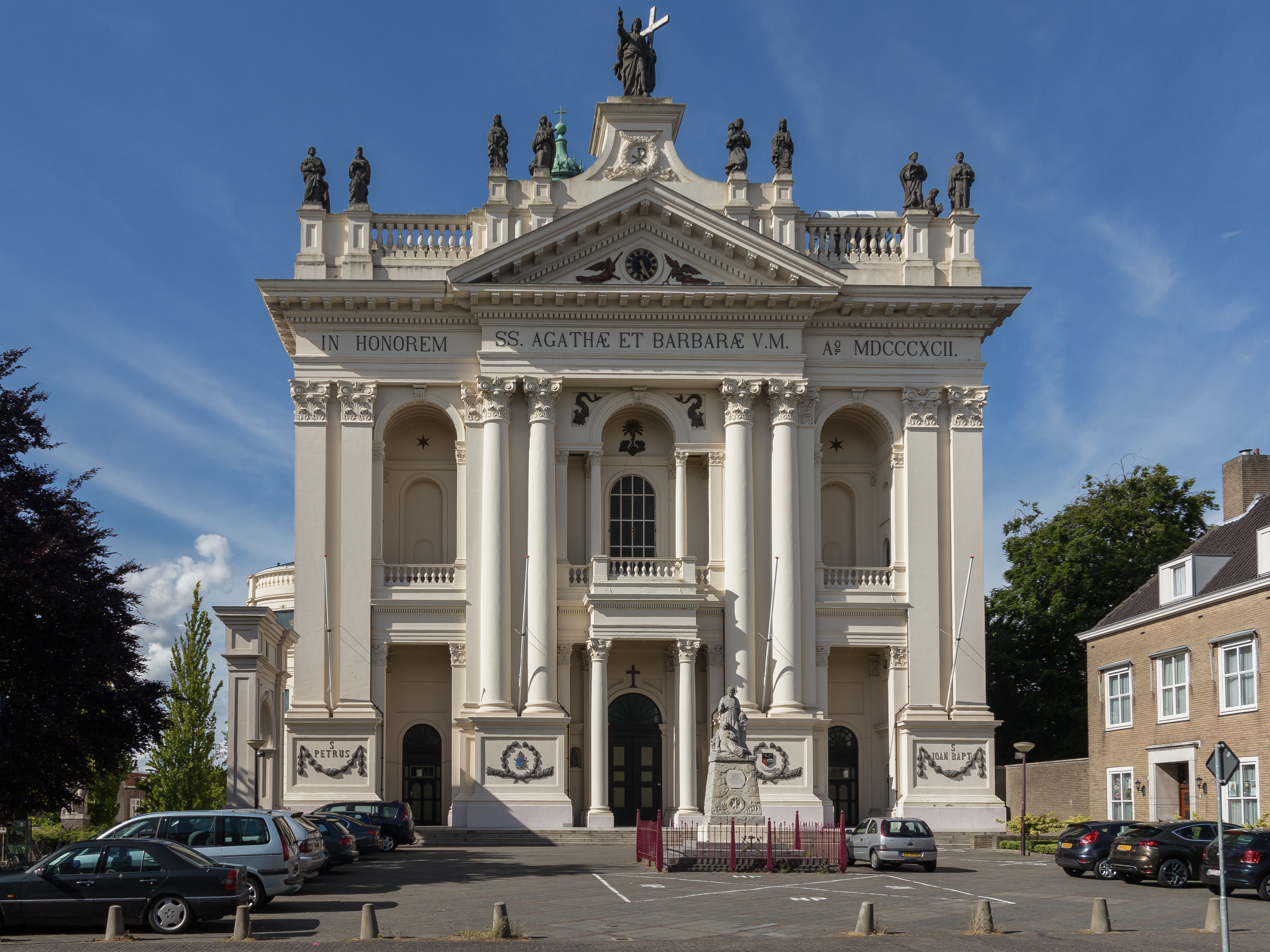
Basilica of the Saints Agatha and Barbara

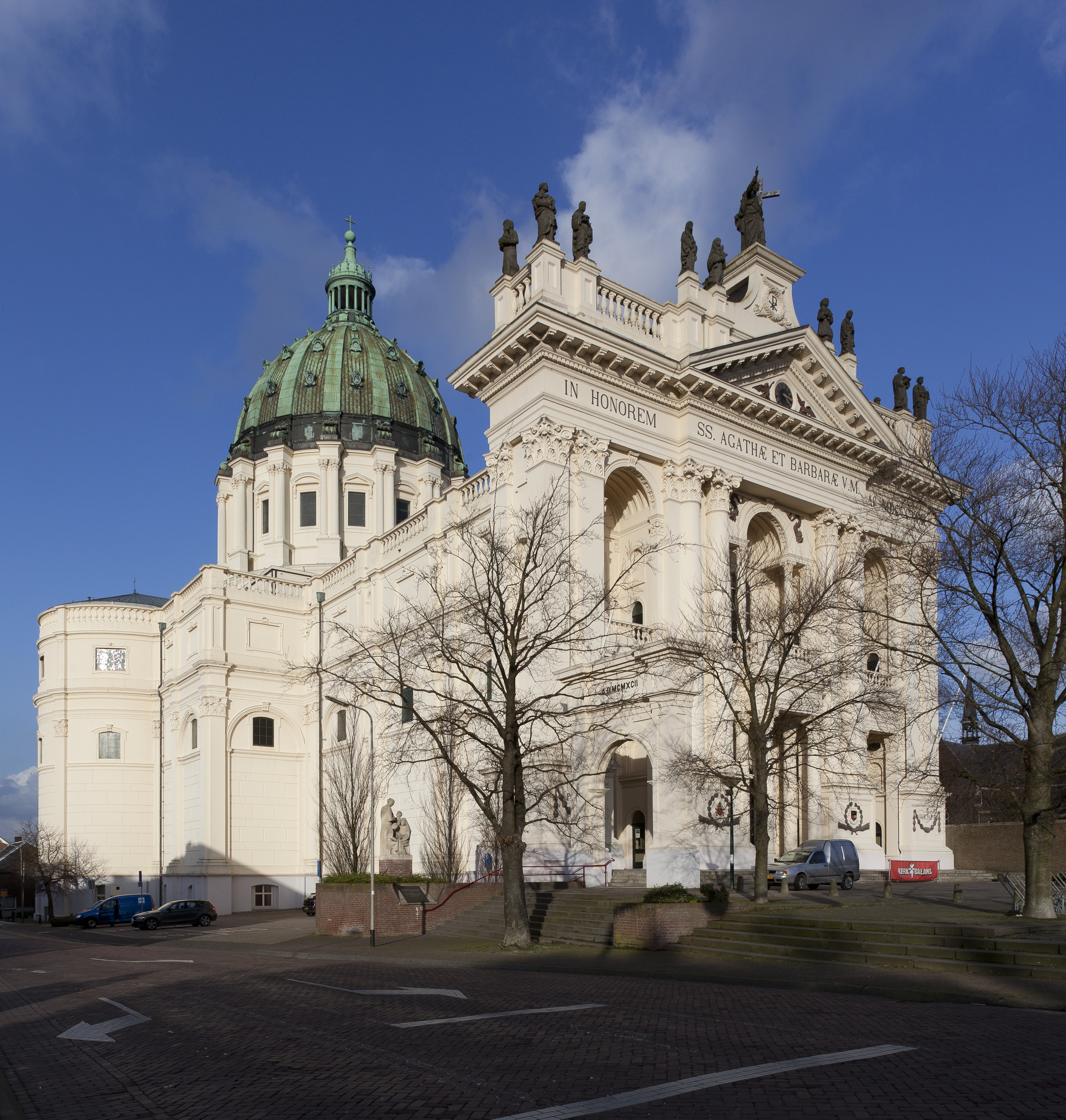

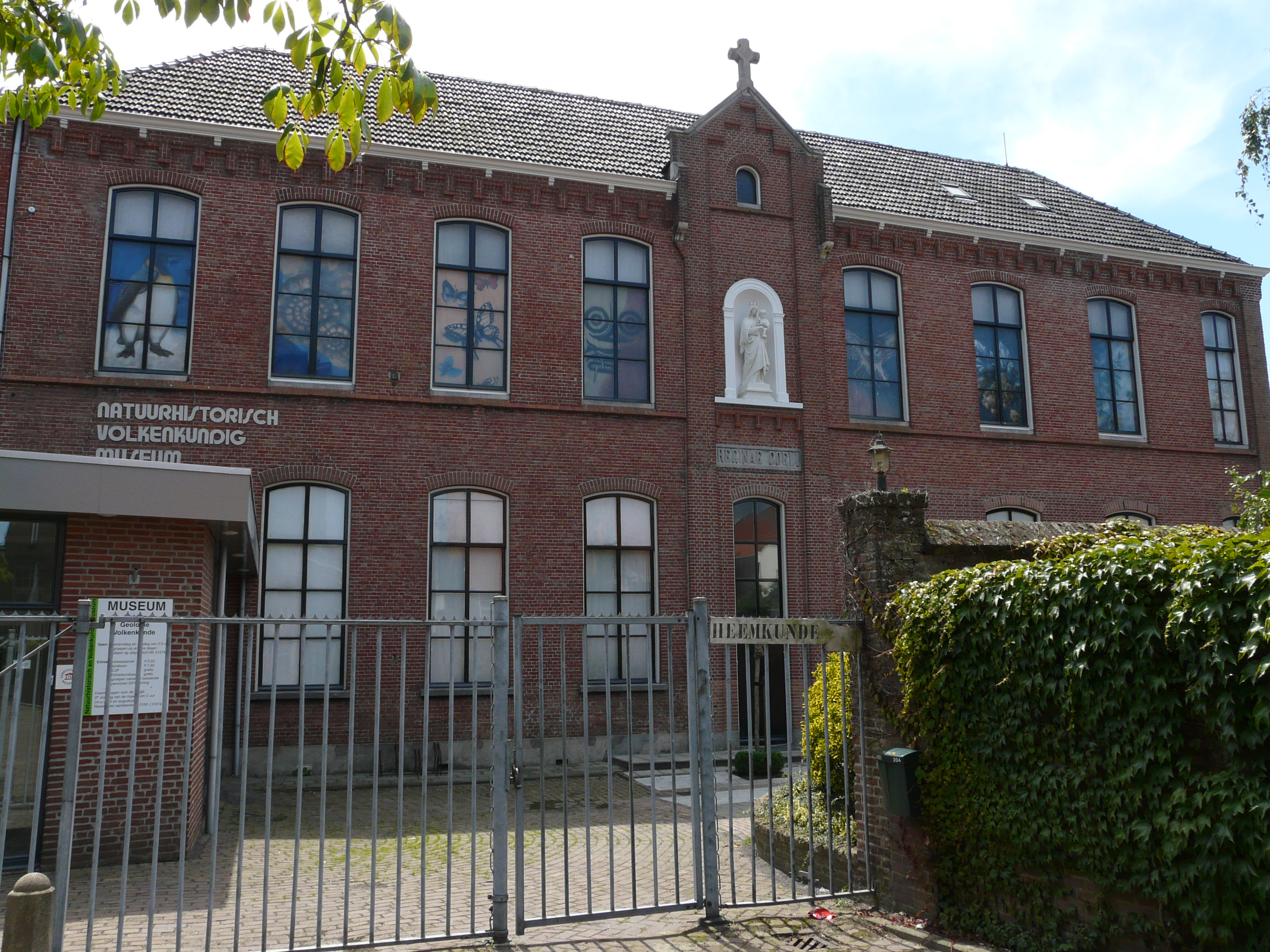
Natural historical and anthropological museum

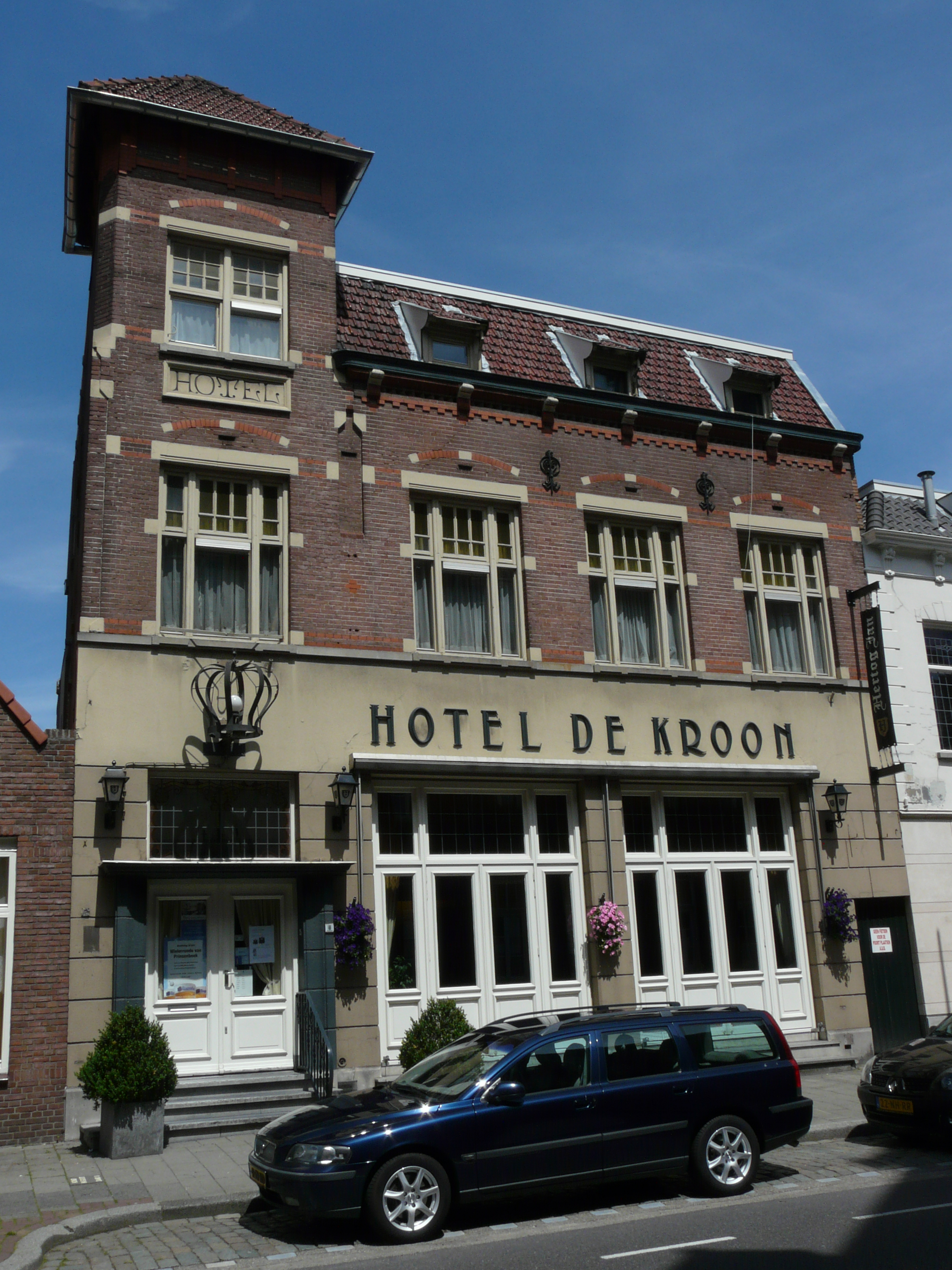
Hotel in Oudenbosch
