= Basilica on the Holy Mountain, Głogówko =

Coordinates: 51.5308°N 17.0208°E

Basilica on the Holy Mountain
- Kościół Niepokalanego Poczęcia NMP i św. Filipa Neri
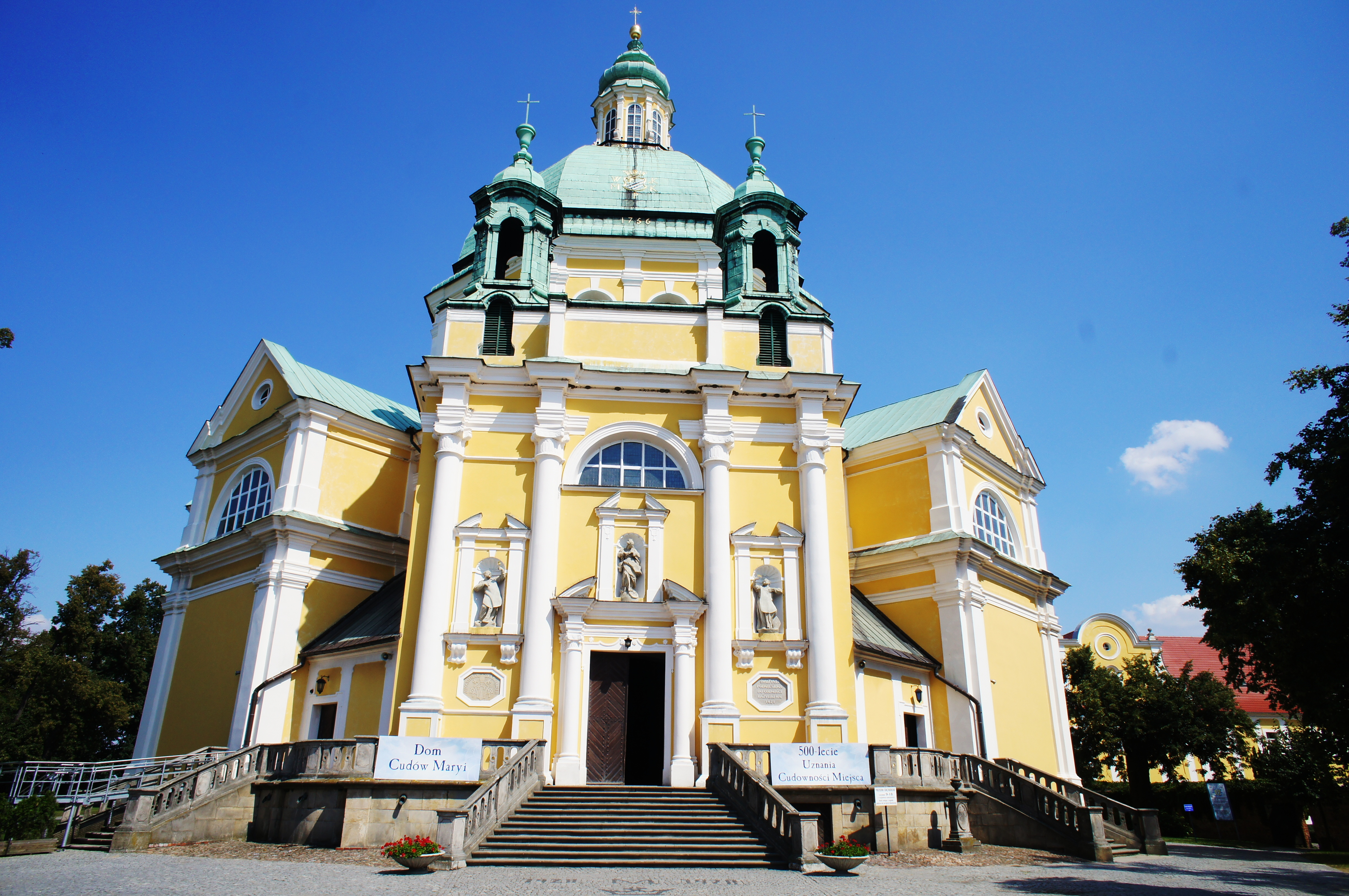
- Basilica on the Holy Mountain
- Basilica on the Holy Mountain
- Location: Głogówko
- Country: Poland
- Denomination: Roman Catholic
- Website: Official Website

Architecture
- Style: Renaissance
- Groundbreaking: 1675
- Completed: 1698

Historic Monument of Poland
- Designated: 2008-03-27
- Reference no.: Dz. U. z 2008 r. Nr 52, poz. 306

Basilica on the Holy Mountain is a historic Oratorian, Renaissance minor basilica in Głogówko, Poland. The shrine is modelled on the Venetian Santa Maria della Salute. It is located on a raised moraine known as Holy Mountain (Święta Góra) near Gostyń, located to its north. In 2008, the basilica was entered onto the List of Historic Monuments of Poland.

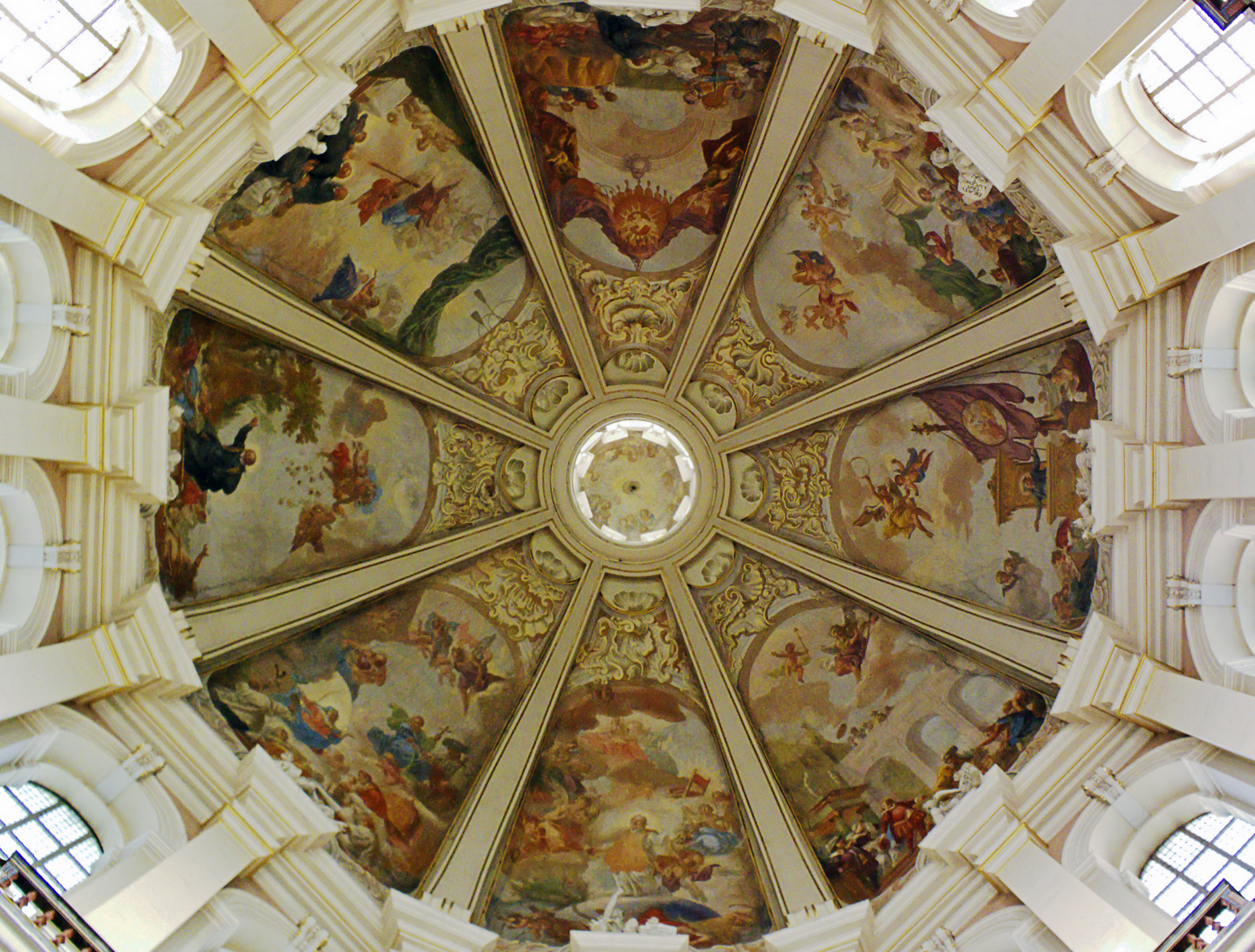
Frescoes on the basilica minor's vault
