= Mackay cabinet =

Cabinet of the Netherlands, 1888 to 1891

- Cabinet of the Netherlands
- Date formed: 21 April 1888
- Date dissolved: 21 August 1891 (Demissionary from 9 July 1891)

People and organisations
- Head of state: King William III (1888–1890); Queen Wilhelmina (1890–1891)
- Head of government: Aeneas Mackay
- No. of ministers: 8
- Ministers removed: 2
- Total no. of members: 10
- Member party: Anti-Revolutionary Party; Independent Catholics; Independent Protestants
- Status in legislature: Centre-right Majority government

History
- Incoming formation: 1888
- Outgoing formation: 1891
- Election: 1888 election
- Outgoing election: 1891 election
- Legislature terms: 1888–1891
- Predecessor: J. Heemskerk cabinet
- Successor: Van Tienhoven cabinet

The Mackay cabinet was the cabinet of the Netherlands from 21 April 1888 until 21 August 1891. The cabinet was formed by the Anti-Revolutionary Party (ARP), Independent Catholics (Ind. C.) and Independent Protestants (Ind. P.) after the election of 1888. The centre-right cabinet was a majority government in the House of Representatives. Aeneas Mackay of the Anti-Revolutionary Party was Prime Minister.

== Composition ==
Composition
Title	Minister			Term of office	
Title	Image	Name	Party	Start	End
Chairman of the Council of Ministers	Aeneas Mackay Jr.	Aeneas Mackay Jr.	ARP	21 April 1888	21 August 1891
Minister of the Interior	Aeneas Mackay Jr.	Aeneas Mackay Jr.	ARP	21 April 1888	24 February 1890
Minister of the Interior	Alexander de Savornin Lohman	Alexander de Savornin Lohman	ARP	24 February 1890	21 August 1891
Minister of Foreign Affairs	Cornelis Hartsen	Cornelis Hartsen	Indep. (Note: Conservative)	21 April 1888	21 August 1891
Minister of Finance	Karel Antonie Godin de Beaufort	Karel Antonie Godin de Beaufort	ARP	21 April 1888	21 August 1891
Minister of Justice	Gustave Ruijs de Beerenbrouck	Gustave Ruijs de Beerenbrouck	Indep. (Note: Catholic)	21 April 1888	21 August 1891
Minister of Water Management, Commerce and Industry	Jacob Havelaar	Jacob Havelaar	ARP	21 April 1888	21 August 1891
Minister of War	Johannes Bergansius	Johannes Bergansius	Indep.	21 April 1888	21 August 1891
Minister of the Navy	Hendrik Dyserinck	Hendrik Dyserinck	Indep.	21 April 1888	31 March 1891
Minister of the Navy	Gerhardus Kruys	Gerhardus Kruys	Indep.	31 March 1891	21 August 1891
Minister of Colonial Affairs	Levinus Keuchenius	Levinus Keuchenius	ARP	21 April 1888	24 February 1890
Minister of Colonial Affairs	Aeneas Mackay Jr.	Aeneas Mackay Jr.	ARP	24 February 1890	21 August 1891
