= 1888 Dutch cabinet formation =

Formation of the Dutch Mackay cabinet

A process of cabinet formation took place following the Dutch general election of 6 and 20 March 1888. The formation resulted in the Mackay cabinet on 21 April 1888. It was the first coalition cabinet, because it consisted of Catholics and the Anti-Revolutionary Party (ARP).

== Background ==
A cartoon made by Johan Braakensiek and published in De Amsterdammer about the 1888 Dutch general election

The 1888 general election took place after a revision of the Constitution of the Netherlands, which allowed twice as many people from voting (more than 300,000 in total). The right-wing parties, united in the Coalition, focused on the school struggle and the neglect of social politics under the liberals. Prominent in the campaign was the founder of the Protestant Anti-Revolutionary Party, Abraham Kuyper. The right was not united, in particular because of differences between the Catholics and the Protestants. Cornelis Bellaar Spruyt, for example, was in favour of a right-wing majority, but warned against a large influence for ultramontanism. The liberals highlighted the differences, warning about both Kuyper and the "Roman ghost". The first round of the election took place on 8 March 1888, with a second round on 20 March. 44 liberals, 28 anti-revolutionaries, 26 Catholics, 1 socialist and 1 conservative. In the Senate, the liberals had kept their majority in the March 1888 Senate election.

== Formateur Mackay ==
Despite Kuyper's leading role and public support in the election against the liberals, king William III was advised to select another anti-revolutionary MP as formateur. It is not clear why they advised against Kuypers, but many assumed it was because of Kuyper's absence of parliament due to sickness. As a polarising figure he might also not be able to achieve enough support. Instead the king gave the assignment to Æneas Mackay, who had been vocal in the school struggle, on 28 March. Mackay accepted the assignment on 30 March.

On 29 March, Mackay met with the Protestant MP Alexander de Savornin Lohman and the Catholic MP Herman Schaepman. Kuyper could not attend, because he was in Berlin. During the meeting, they agreed to the formation of a right-wing cabinet. Because of differences between the two groups, however, neither wanted to commit to the cabinet and agreements made during the formation. During the meeting, they also discussed what policies the new cabinet should pursue. They were aware of the majority of the liberals in the Senate, so realised not all desired reforms would be possible. To improve chances of success in the Senate, they focused on rational, partial reforms.

=== Search for ministers ===
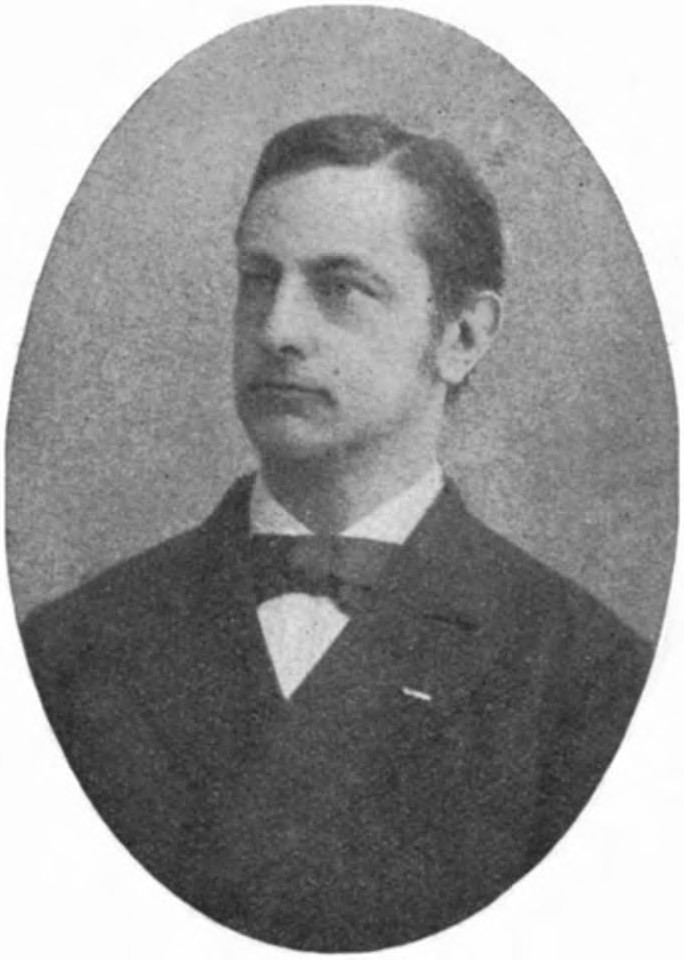
Alexander de Savornin Lohman, prominent anti-revolutionary MP, 1901

Mackay had a hard time finding ministers for his cabinet. In part this was because the right had until then not formed a cabinet, so did not have candidates with experience. Most other (politically) capable people on the right had been elected to parliament, and it was at that time seen as unwise to move them to cabinet, which would force them to resign their seats in parliament and thus trigger by-elections. During their meeting on 29 March, Lohman and Schaepman agreed that Mackay should become minister of the Interior. Despite his objections, he accepted this, because he also believed the king would require him as formateur to enter the cabinet. Both Lohman and Schaepman wanted to remain in the House.

Lohman proposed his brother Maurits Adriaan de Savornin Lohman as minister of Justice, whom he had already sounded out. Schaepman instead proposed the Catholic MP Gustave Ruijs van Beerenbroek, which would satisfy the inhabitants of his native Limburg. This convinced Mackay and Lohman, and Ruijs van Beerenbroek accepted on 7 April. For minister of Colonies, they quickly agreed on Levinus Keuchenius, who accepted this on 9 April. His candidacy was controversial, as some feared his inclusion would lead to the fall of the cabinet.

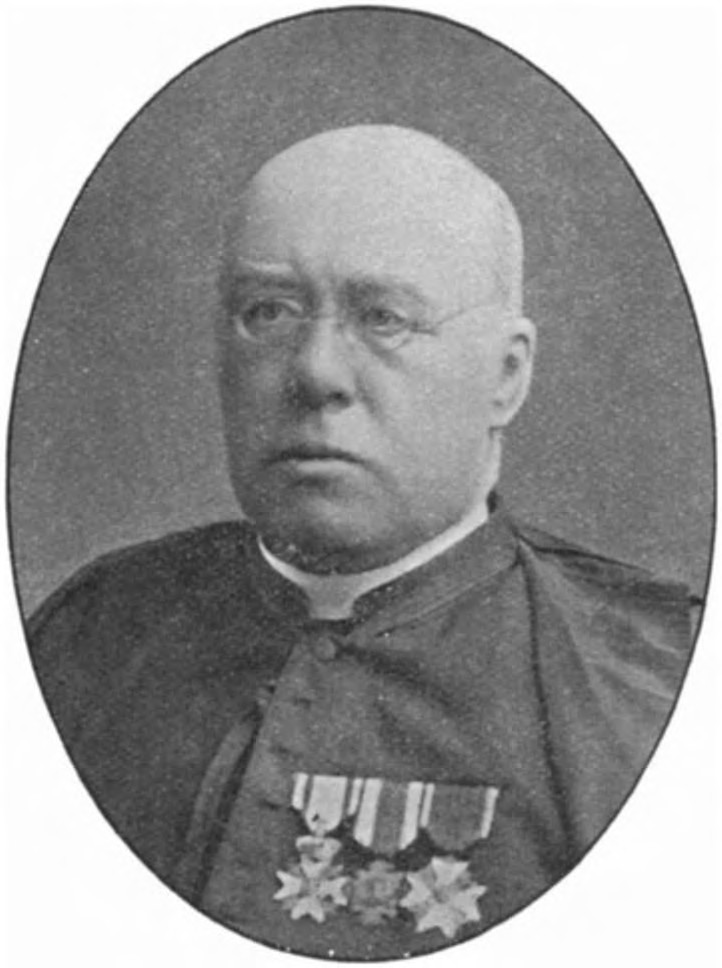
Herman Schaepman, prominent Catholic MP, 1901

For Water Management, Commerce and Industry, Lohman proposed Alexander van Dedem, Petrus Johannes van Swinderen and Jacob Havelaar. Schaepman mentioned Felix Theodoor Westerwoudt. Both Van Swinderen and Westerwoudt were approached, but refused for personal reasons. Mackay then approached Havelaar, who responded positive, and was later formally asked and accepted. Schaepman had also proposed Westerwoudt for Finance, but he refused this post as well. Mackay then approached the conservative former Senator Cornelis Hartsen, who had many objections. Lohman and Kuyper made several attempts to convince Hartsen otherwise. In the end however, they had to conclude that his policy demands were unacceptable and might lead to the demise of the cabinet. Instead Karel Antonie Godin de Beaufort, antirevolutionary MP who had worked with Mackay on a programme for the cabinet, was asked as minister of Finance and accepted.

For Foreign Affairs, Mackay first asked former minister of Foreign affairs, Jacob van Zuylen van Nijevelt, who declined for health reasons. Lohman and Kuypers proposed the Catholic Louis Gericke van Herwijnen, but Schaepman objected to a Catholic minister of Foreign Affairs. The Pope might put pressure on a Catholic to create a diplomatic mission to the Holy See, which would be unacceptable to the Protestants. Instigated by Kuyper, they decided to ignore the objection and ask him anyway, but he refused because of old age. Lohman and Kuyper then proposed Frederik van Bylandt, but Mackay indicated that he could not work together with him. Mackay then asked whether Hartsen would be willing to become minister of Foreign Affairs. After meeting with Godin de Beaufort to discuss some of his objections, Hartsen accepted the candidacy.

For minister of War, Mackay met with general Clemens Diederik Hendrik Schneider, recommended by Schaepman, but he refused. Lohman then met with colonel Johannes Bergansius on behalf of Mackay on 6 April, who accepted the post. For minister of Navy, Mackay had received several refusals before finding antirevolutionary and former general Jan Elias Nicolaas Schimmelpenninck van der Oye willing. Mackay, however, learned that both the Navy and king were opposed to someone with a background in the army becoming minister of Navy. Mackay then asked lieutenant commander George August Tindal, who did not immediately decline but had doubts because of his age. Mackay met another officer of the Navy, but he declined because of his low rank in the Navy. Mackay then approached former Navy officer Van Herwaarden, who declined. Herwaarden did however bring Mackay in contact with the independent Navy officer Hendrik Dyserinck, who accepted on 17 April.

On 18 April, Mackay sent the list of candidates to the king for approval. The king had some questions, in particular about Keuchenius, but Mackay was able to convince the king. By royal order of 20 April, Mackay was appointed minister on 20 April and the other ministers a day later.

== Aftermath ==
The Mackay cabinet was able to complete its entire term until the 1891 general election, where the Coalition lost their majority. Keuchenius was forced to resign after two years, while Dyserinck was forced to resign a year later after a motion of censure.
