= Nicolaas Pierson =

Dutch politician (1839–1909)

His Excellency Nicolaas Pierson
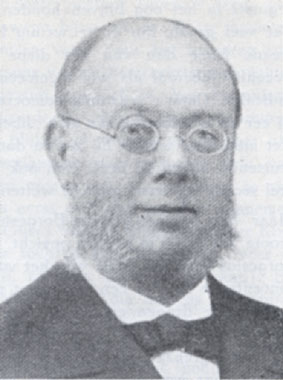

Chairman of the Council of Ministers
- In office 27 July 1897 – 1 August 1901
- Monarch: Wilhelmina
- Regent: Emma (1897-1898)
- Preceded by: Joan Röell
- Succeeded by: Abraham Kuyper

Minister of Finance
- In office 21 August 1891 – 9 May 1894
- Prime Minister: Gijsbert van Tienhoven
- Preceded by: Karel Antonie Godin de Beaufort
- Succeeded by: Jacobus Petrus Sprenger van Eyk

Personal details
- Born: Nicolaas Gerard Pierson; 7 February 1839 Amsterdam, Netherlands
- Died: 24 December 1909 (aged 70) Heemstede, Netherlands
- Party: Liberal
- Spouse: Catharina Rutgera Waller
- Education: University of Leiden; University of Cambridge
- Occupation: Economist

Nicolaas Gerard Pierson (7 February 1839 – 24 December 1909) was a Dutch economist and Liberal statesman who served as the chairman of the Council of Ministers (Prime Minister) of the Netherlands from 1897 until 1901.

Pierson was a professor economics and statistics at the University of Amsterdam and director and presiding director (president-directeur) of the De Nederlandsche Bank, the Dutch national bank. He was minister of Finance in the Cabinet Van Tienhoven. During his term of office he introduced an important tax revision. After serving as chairman of the Council of Ministers for four years he took a seat in the House of Representatives for the constituency of Gorinchem from 1905 to 1909. Pierson received an honorary doctorate from the University of Cambridge.

== Early life and education ==
Nicolaas Gerard Pierson was born in Amsterdam on 7 February 1839, to Jan Lodewijk Gregory Pierson and his wife Ida Oyens. The youngest of six children, Pierson had two brothers and three sisters. Two of his brothers, Allard and Hendrik Pierson, would become famous pastors. His father was a merchant, while his mother was a Réveil writer.

Pierson attended a French school in Amsterdam from 1845 to 1853. He went to an English school in Brussels in 1853, but switched to a trade school in Amsterdam a year later. On 2 June 1864, Pierson graduated as a teacher in political economy.

== Career ==
Pierson started his career as a merchant. He worked in his father's glass shop from 1860 to 1861, and owned a business selling colonial goods, Beckman en Pierson, from 1861 to 1864. Shortly before his graduation, on 1 April 1864, he became chief executive of De Surinaamsche Bank, and director of De Nederlandsche Bank on 1 June 1868. On 15 January 1885, he was appointed as President of De Nederlandsche Bank by Royal Decree. He took office 1 February the same year, and kept his position until 21 Augustus 1891. Aside from his career in the financial sector, he also taught political economy at a trade school in Amsterdam from 1864 to 1868, and political economy and statistics at the University of Amsterdam from 1877 and 1885. Pierson's main two economist texts were Grondbeginselen der Staathuiskunde and Leerboek der Staathuiskunde, the latter being translated into English and Italian. In 1883 Pierson became member of the Royal Netherlands Academy of Arts and Sciences.

Pierson served as minister of Finance from 21 August 1891 to 9 May 1894, and again from 26 July 1897 to 1 August 1901. During his second his second term as minister, he was also the chairman of the Council of Ministers, a positional that would later be dubbed Prime Minister of the Netherlands. During his time as minister, he reformed the corporate and capital tax systems, and was instrumental in the establishment of Statistics Netherlands, the national statistical office. On 26 July 1905, Pierson was elected into the House of Representatives for the constituency of Gorinchem. He did not seek election in 1909, giving up his seat on 1 August.

== Cabinet of social justice ==
A progressive liberal, Pierson presided over a wide range of reforms as prime minister which led to his cabinet becoming known as the “Cabinet of social justice.” Measures were enacted in education, worker safety, and health, with the government (as noted by one study) “breaking with past traditions in, amongst other things, making vaccinations compulsory and regulating the water supply to combat the outbreak of infectious diseases.” A series of factory acts were passed to strengthen and expand on demands laid down in a previous act from 1895, while local authorities were compelled (as one study has noted) “to establish minimum requirements for safe housing.” In addition, accident insurance was made mandatory for all industrial workers by a 1901 act. A governmental decree of the 24th of June 1898 contained various health and safety provisions for factory workers. The Phosphorlucifer Act (Stb. 1901, 133) put an absolute ban on white phosphorus, which caused the disease phosphorus necrosis in workers who handled it.

Under the Compulsory Education Act (1900) compulsory education was set at six years (with limited refresher education) although exemptions were granted for work in agriculture, horticulture and peat farming. The Act also authorized municipal authorities (as noted by one study) “to provide food and clothing to children who could not attend school due to a lack of sufficient food, in order to promote school attendance.” As a result of this law, the Netherlands became (as noted by one study) “the first country where the possibility for school meals was regulated by law.” The Water Management Act 1900 contained rules on flood prevention and the maintenance of waterworks, and under the Health Act (1901) inspectors and Chief Inspectors were charged with enforcing laws (such as Housing Act passed in 1900 which contained provisions on the requirements that municipalities must set for building and rebuilding homes, and for proper habitation) while local health commissions were set up. The Laws of the Child (1901) included provisions (as one study has noted) “on the possibility of depriving parents of parental authority, regulation of child protection, the establishment of guardianship councils, punishments and criminal proceedings against juveniles and lowering the age of majority to 21 years.”

== Socialist calculation debate ==
Pierson is credited with an important role in the Socialist calculation debate, when he criticised Karl Kautsky, who had delivered a speech in Delft in 1902. Entitled The Problem of Value in the Socialist Community, this attracted little attention outside the Netherlands until it appeared in English translation in Friedrich Hayek's Collectivist Economic Planning.

== Family ==
On 30 October 1862, Pierson married Catharina Rutgera Waller in Amsterdam. She died shortly after their marriage, and the couple remained childless. Pierson died on 24 December 1909, in Heemstede.

Business positions
Preceded by Willem Mees	President of De Nederlandsche Bank; 1885–1891	Succeeded by Norbertus van den Berg
Political offices
Preceded by Karel Antonie Godin de Beaufort	Minister of Finance; 1891–1894	Succeeded by Jacobus Petrus Sprenger van Eyk
Preceded by Jacobus Petrus Sprenger van Eyk	Minister of Finance; 1897–1901	Succeeded by Jan Harte van Tecklenburg
Preceded by Joan Röell	Prime Minister of the Netherlands; 1897–1901	Succeeded by Abraham Kuyper
House of Representatives of the Netherlands
Preceded by Hendrik Seret	Member for Gorinchem; 1905–1909	Succeeded by Hendrik Pollema
