= 1948 Dutch cabinet formation =

Formation of the Drees–Van Schaik cabinet

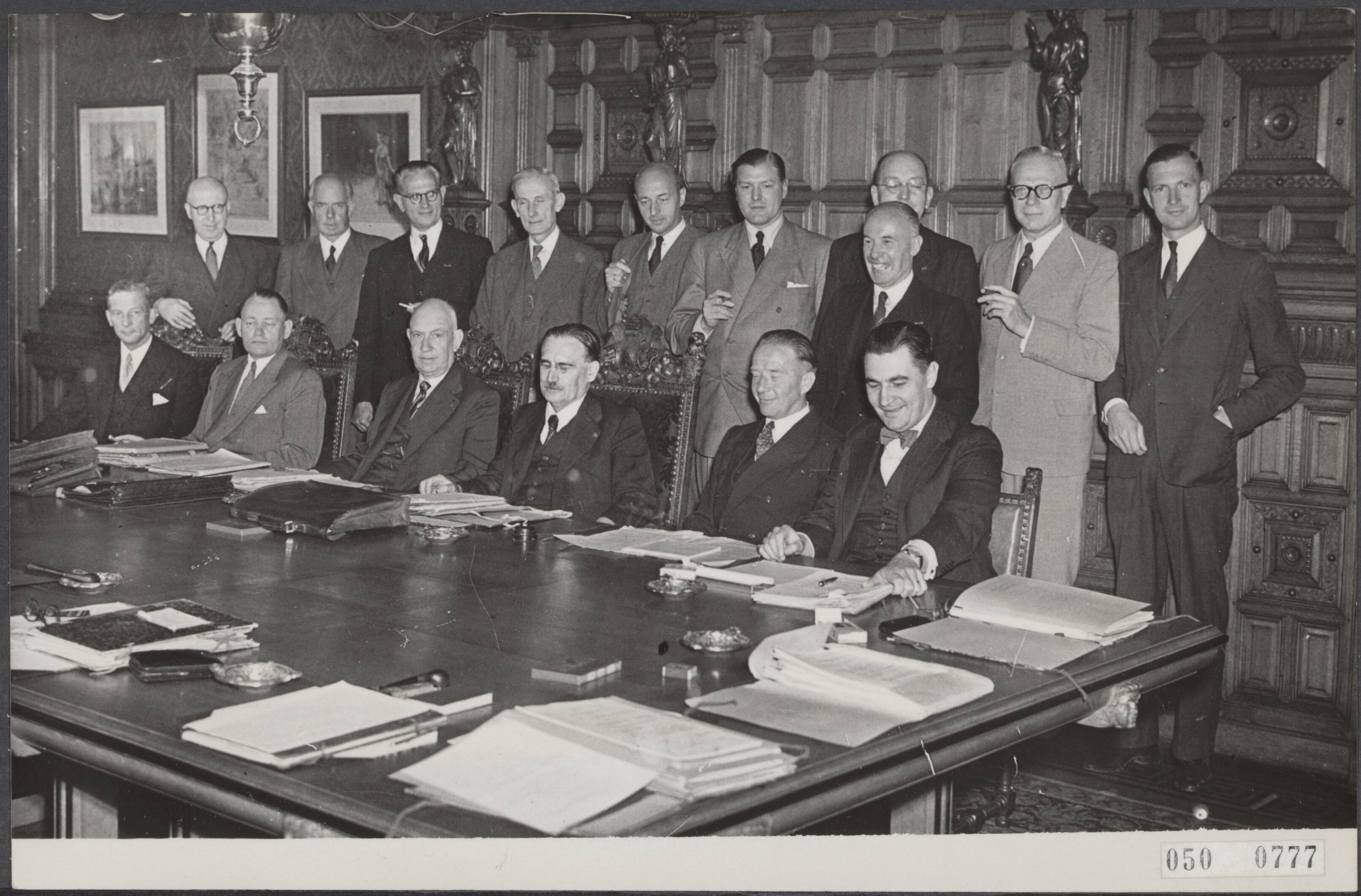
First Council of Ministers of the Drees-Van Schaik cabinet on 10 August 1948.

A cabinet formation took place in Netherlands after the general election of 7 July 1948. On 7 August this led to the formation of the Drees-Van Schaik cabinet. The cabinet was formed by the Catholic People's Party (KVP), Labour Party (PvdA), Christian Historical Union (CHU), and the People's Party for Freedom and Democracy (VVD).

== Background ==
=== First Beel cabinet ===
The first Beel cabinet, consisting of KVP and PvdA under the chairmanship of Prime Minister Louis Beel, had submitted a constitutional amendment. This constitutional amendment introduced a new legal order for overseas territories and introduced state secretaries in the cabinet. After the House of Representatives and Senate approved it in the first reading with support from VVD and CHU, new general and Senate elections were called. The newly elected parliament would need to approve the constitutional amendment with a two-thirds majority in the second reading.

=== General election ===
The seat distribution of the newly elected House of Representatives during the cabinet formation: CPN (8) PvdA (27) VVD (8) ARP (13) CHU (9) KVP (37) KNP (1) SGP (2)

Parties like ARP, CHU, and KVP initially focused their campaigns on the Indonesian issue and the constitutional revision. However, this quickly shifted when research showed that housing shortages, the economic situation, and the communist "threat" were more pressing concerns for the public. The KVP distanced itself from the PvdA – partly due to criticism of Finance Minister Piet Lieftinck – under pressure from the Catholic National Party (KNP), which had split from the KVP over its Indonesia policy and cooperation with the PvdA. The PvdA ran a moderate campaign to continue its collaboration with the KVP and achieve a breakthrough in the Catholic south. The VVD highlighted its necessity for the two-thirds majority and indicated it would demand a price for it. The election results saw no major changes; the Communist Party of the Netherlands (CPN) and PvdA each lost two seats, the VVD gained two, and the KNP and CHU each gained one.

== Formateur Beel ==
=== First assignment ===
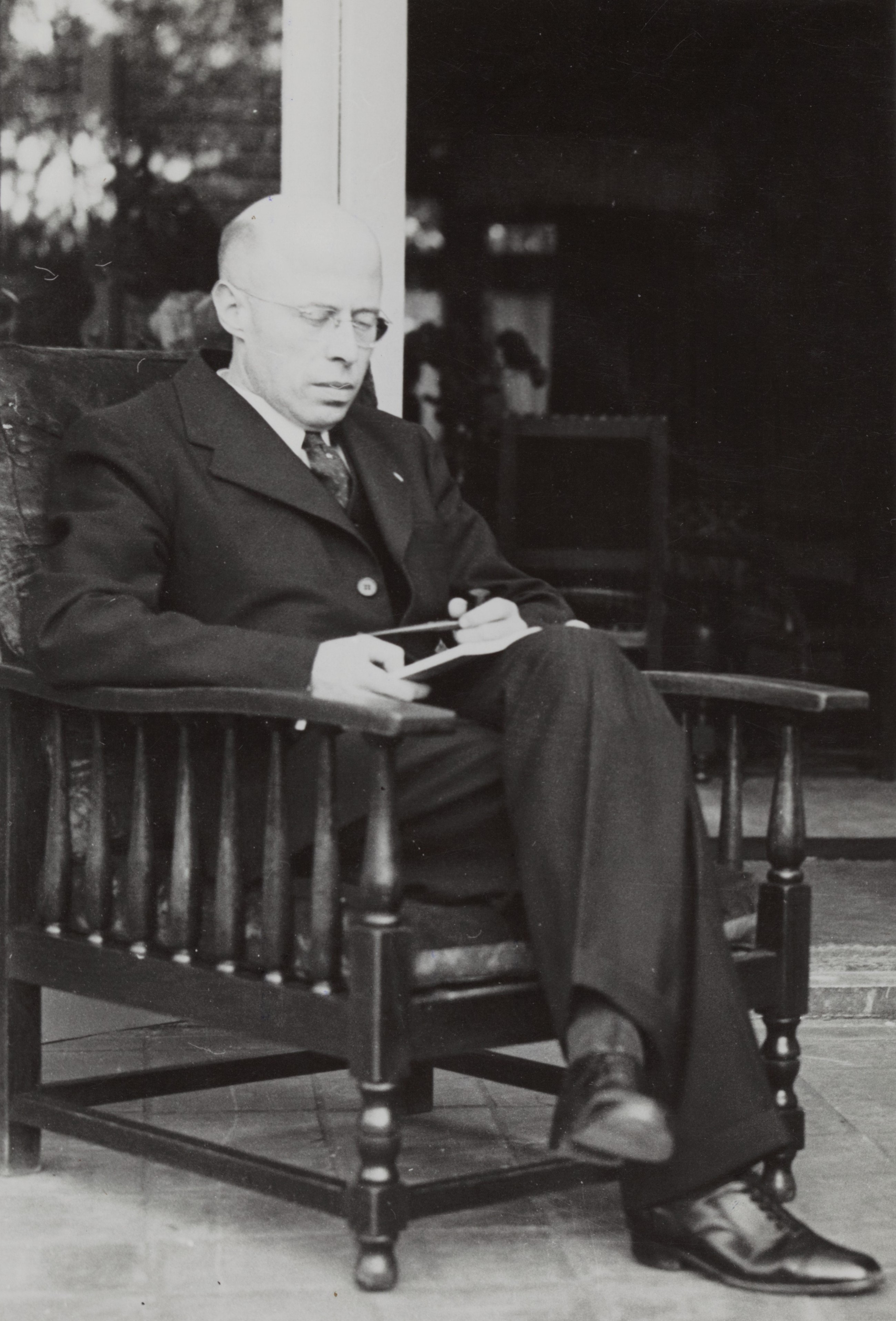
Image of Louis Beel, published the day after his appointment as formateur.

After consultations, regentess Juliana appointed Louis Beel (KVP) as formateur on 13 July. His assignment was the 'formation of a parliamentary cabinet that enjoys as much confidence from the House as possible' to secure a two-thirds majority for the constitutional amendment. Beel began by drafting a program, shorter than two years ago. He then spoke with the party leaders who had supported the constitutional amendment in the first reading and made changes to the program.

Apart from disagreements over the program, there was also disagreement about the party composition of the cabinet. The KVP wanted as many parties as possible to ensure the constitutional amendment, but could also accept a three-party cabinet. The PvdA preferred a two-party cabinet (the Roman/Red combination) and especially no VVD ministers. A cooperation agreement on the constitutional amendment was rejected by the VVD and CHU. Those two parties only wanted to join the cabinet together. An extra-parliamentary cabinet was rejected by the PvdA, leading to a stalemate in the formation.

In a meeting on 21 July, Beel proposed a compromise where a four-party cabinet would be parliamentary only for the Indonesian issue and international policy, and where parliamentary groups would not be bound on other topics. The cabinet would then end once the biggest issues on these topics were resolved. The PvdA rejected this again, as the Indonesian issue was the biggest point of contention and other topics also deserved attention. The next day, Beel returned his assignment.

=== Second assignment ===
On 23 July Juliana again gave Beel an assignment, this time to form 'a cabinet.' The PvdA was unhappy with this turn towards an extra-parliamentary cabinet, but the parliamentary groups decided by majority that the ministers could speak with Beel based on the new assignment. The fear in the PvdA was that Beel might form a cabinet without the party, meaning Dolf Joekes would no longer be minister of Overseas Territories.

In the following days, parliamentary leaders in the House of Representatives Marinus van der Goes van Naters (PvdA) and Carl Romme (KVP) agreed that the broad base could be seen as an intermezzo and that a small coalition of PvdA and KVP would be preferred afterward. Beel included KVP elements in the government program, such as child benefits for large families and health care, but this was removed after objections from Drees. Also, the mention that 'police actions' were among the possibilities was removed as too premature.

On 26 July, Beel spoke with potential PvdA ministers from the demissionary cabinet, including Willem Drees, Lieftinck, and Sicco Mansholt. Beel would take the Overseas Territories himself ad interim and Lubbert Götzen as minister without portfolio in that department. For Justice, Beel invited Leen Donker (PvdA). This seemed to rule out the PvdA's desired appointment of Joekes. CHU proposed Wim Schokking for Transport and Water Management.

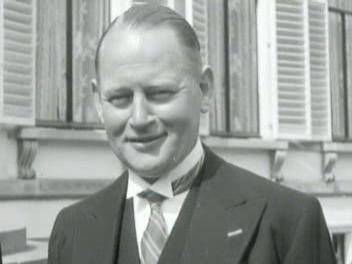
Dirk Stikker in 1948

The VVD wanted founders Dirk Stikker or Pieter Oud in the cabinet, particularly for Foreign Affairs. Beel contacted Stikker for Foreign Affairs, despite objections from the PvdA. For the PvdA, Schokking and Wim Fockema Andreae as liberals in the cabinet were acceptable. Beel urged Stikker to find a liberal acceptable to the PvdA, but this was unsuccessful.

Beel and Lieftinck sought a solution on July 28 to make Stikker acceptable to the PvdA. They considered asking Joekes for Justice. Van der Goes van Naters, unaware of Beel and Lieftinck's discussions, spoke that same day to the PvdA party board and council. Although they supported participation in a Beel cabinet as long as it had a progressive program, Van der Goes van Naters rejected a ministership for Stikker, Oud, or Hendrik Tilanus (CHU). Van der Goes van Naters did not intend this as a breaking point, but Drees found it unacceptable to soften his words now. The next day, the VVD's proposal in the House to postpone the investigation into the constitutional amendment until after the formation was rejected. Van der Goes van Naters' statement, the VVD's negative reaction, and the House discussion prompted Beel to return his assignment on 29 July.

== Formateur Van Schaik ==
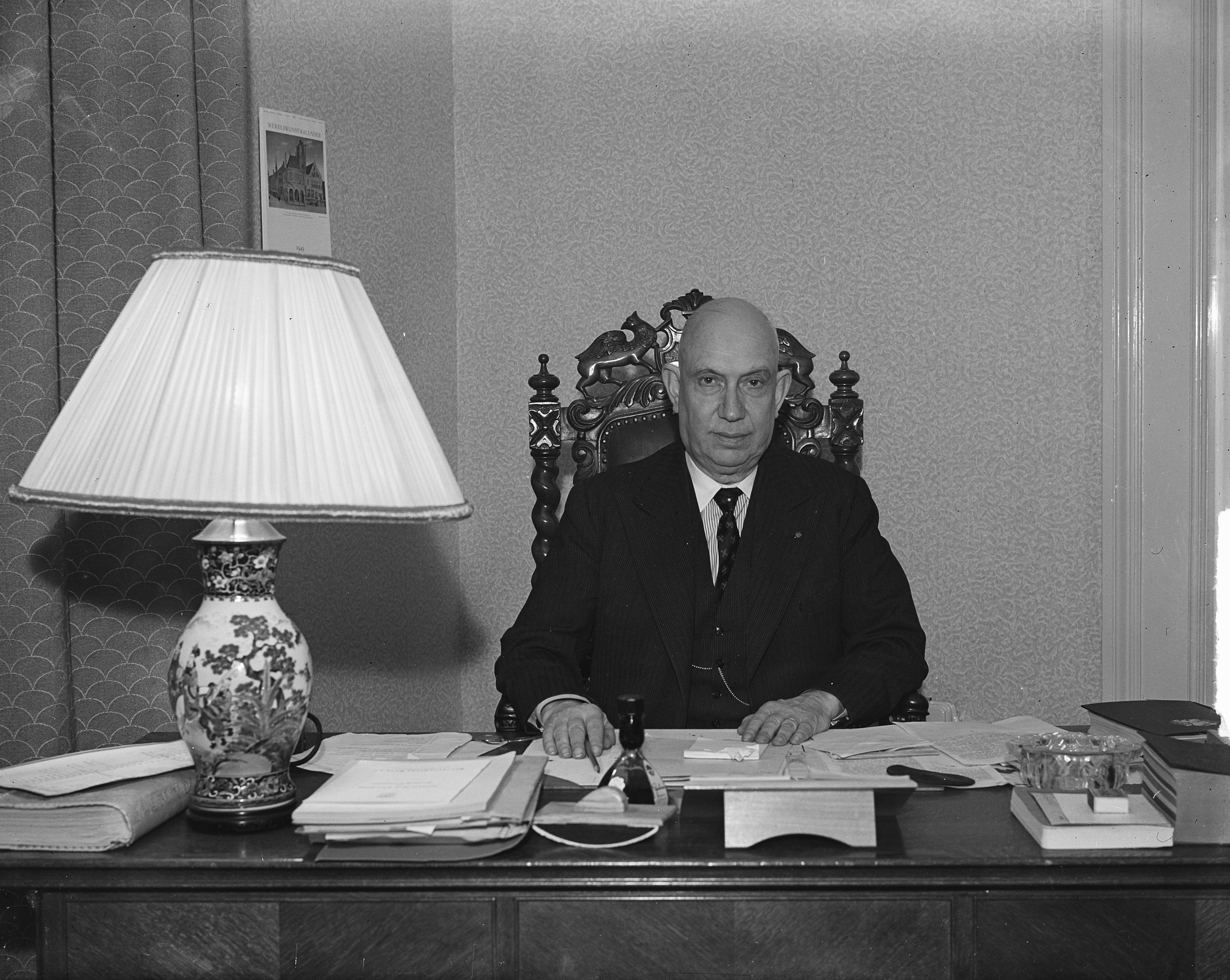
Josef van Schaik on 30 December 1948.

After consulting Drees, Juliana appointed House Speaker Josef van Schaik (KVP) as formateur. Van Schaik felt the PvdA went too far in Beel's formation but hoped to get the party on board with a different approach. The plan emerged to make Drees Prime Minister, to remove objections to broadening the base. The KVP would get Overseas Territories and Justice but would leave the desired Social Affairs to Joekes. Van Schaik tried to get Stikker for Transport and Water Management, but Stikker insisted on Foreign Affairs to have enough influence on the Indonesian issue. Van Schaik asked Maan Sassen for Overseas Territories, who was initially unhappy with it. Van Schaik then tried Hans s'Jacob (CHU) for the position, but the KVP eventually chose Sassen. Beel would replace Huib van Mook as lieutenant-governor-general of the Dutch East Indies.

The situation then was that the KVP ministers only wanted to join with the VVD, the VVD only wanted to join with Stikker on Foreign Affairs, and the KVP was unhappy with a PvdA prime minister and disappointed they didn't get Agriculture. On 4 August, the question for the PvdA was whether they were willing to accept Stikker. After intense internal deliberation, the party agreed. On 5 August, the formation was practically complete. The constitutive deliberation on 6 August did not present serious difficulties and mainly discussed replacing Van Mook with Beel. The cabinet was sworn in a day later. On 17 August, Drees delivered the government statement in the House.
