= Gijsbert van Tienhoven =

Dutch politician (1841–1914)

His Excellency Gijsbert van Tienhoven
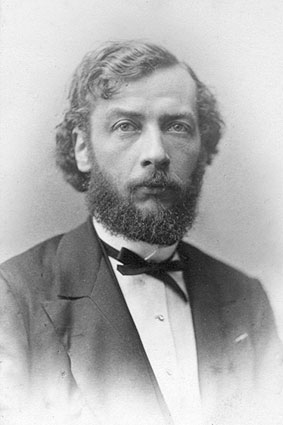

Chairman of the Council of Ministers
- In office 21 August 1891 – 9 May 1894
- Monarch: Wilhelmina
- Regent: Emma
- Preceded by: Æneas, Baron Mackay
- Succeeded by: Joan Röell

Personal details
- Born: 12 February 1841 De Werken, Netherlands
- Died: 10 October 1914 (aged 73) Bentveld, Netherlands
- Spouse: Anna Sara Maria Hacke
- Education: University of Amsterdam

Gijsbert van Tienhoven (12 February 1841 – 10 October 1914) was a Dutch liberal politician. He started his political career in the municipal council and executive of Amsterdam, and served as mayor of Amsterdam from 1880 to 1891. He spent one year in the House of Representatives and eleven years in the Senate before being appointed formateur after the 1891 general election. For three years, he served as Prime Minister of the Netherlands and Minister of Foreign Affairs before his cabinet fell in 1894. He also served as Queen's Commissioner of North Holland for fourteen years, between 1897 and 1911.

== Early life and education ==
Gijsbert van Tienhoven was born in De Werken in North Brabant, on 12 February 1841. He was the eighth child in a family of twelve. His father, Gijsbert van Tienhoven (10 April 1801, Ameide), was a contractor of public works and landowner in Werkendam. His mother was Klazina Christina van den Bogaard (12 August 1806, Rozenburg). He enjoyed private primary education, and attended a latin school in Gorinchem. In 1860, Van Tienhoven started studying theology at the University of Applied Sciences Utrecht, but never finished the programme. Instead, he studied Roman and contemporary law, graduating on 13 June 1866.

After his graduation, Van Tienhoven briefly worked as a lawyer in The Hague. In 1867, he became an official at the Ministry of Justice. Starting as deputy chief clerk of the department of preparation of legislation, he eventually became referendary of the department. On 27 January 1869, however, he left the Ministry to become professor of Roman and contemporary law at the Athenaeum Illustre of Amsterdam, where he would remain until 1 January 1874. He was also school inspector in the third school district of Amsterdam from 1 September 1873 to 1 February 1877.

== Political career ==
Van Tienhoven was elected into the municipal council of Amsterdam on 4 February 1874, and served as Alderman of Finance of the city from 14 November that same year until 1 January 1880. As Aldermen, he introduced an ordinance on local income tax. He also strongly supported municipal construction of residences for labourers, a proposal which passed through the municipal council by 16 to 14 votes. At the same time, the rising population of the city necessitated initial measures in the field of social housing. On 11 December 1879, Van Tienhoven was appointed, by Royal Decree, as Mayor of Amsterdam, taking office on 1 January the following year. His eleven years in office coincided with the economic and social modernisation of the city. Under his mayorship, Amsterdam hosted a large international exhibition on colonisation and export in 1883, and saw the opening of the Rijksmuseum and the Royal Concertgebouw in 1885 and 1888 respectively. Van Tienhoven left office on 21 August 1891, and gave up on his seat in the municipal council some two weeks later, on 3 September.

On 15 December, Van Tienhoven was elected into the States of North Holland for the constituency of Amsterdam. He did not retain his seat for long, however, as he was elected into the House of Representatives of the Netherlands for the constituency of Amsterdam in a by-election in 1878. In the House, he spoke about water management, home affairs, finance, the railways and other policy areas. He did not seek re-election in the 1879 general election. He entered the Senate on 28 July 1880, where he sat for the constituency of North Holland.

After the 1891 general election, Van Tienhoven was appointed formateur, tasked with forming a new cabinet. Starting on 21 August 1891, he headed the Van Tienhoven cabinet as the chairman of the Council of Ministers, a position that would later be dubbed Prime Minister of the Netherlands. In this cabinet, he also served as Minister of Foreign Affairs. In the Prinsjesdag of that year, the new cabinet pledged to reform suffrage and the tax system, improve the safety and working conditions in factories, and introduce social insurance for old or cripples labourers. As Prime Minister, Van Tienhoven hosted an international conference about international private law in 1893. In 1894, minister of the Interior Johannes Tak van Poortvliet introduces a bill that would introduce universal male suffrage. Van Tienhoven supported this bill, but it was rejected by the House of Representatives, which caused the fall of the cabinet. Van Tienhoven resigned and his cabinet dissolved on 21 March 1894.

On 7 June 1894, Van Tienhoven returned to the Senate. He was appointed, by Royal Decree, as Queen's Commissioner of North Holland on 27 January 1897, and took office five days later. He spent fourteen years as Queen's Commissioner, resigning on 1 August 1911 due to his old age and his private life. Van Tienhoven took up residence in a mansion in Bentvelt, where he died on 10 October 1914, at the age of 73.

== Private life ==
Van Tienhoven married in Loosdrecht, on 12 September 1866. He and his wife, Anna Sarah Maria Hacke, had six sons and three daughters. He was a member of the Dutch Reformed Church.

== Electoral performance ==
1878 Amsterdam by-election

Candidate	Party	First round		Second round	
Candidate	Party	Votes	%	Votes	%
Gijsbert van Tienhoven	Independent	763	38.83	866	50.82
Asser van Nierop	Independent	741	37.71	838	49.18
Maurits Jacob van Lennep	Independent	452	23.00		
Other candidates		9	0.46		
Total		1,965	100.00	1,704	100.00
Valid votes		1,965	99.54	1,704	98.78
Invalid/blank votes		9	0.46	21	1.22
Total votes		1,974	100.00	1,725	100.00
Registered voters/turnout		4,602	42.89	4,602	37.48
Source: Huygens Instituut

Political offices
Preceded by Cornelis Hartsen	Minister of Foreign Affairs; 1891–1894	Succeeded by Joannes Coenraad Jansen
Preceded by Baron Mackay	Prime Minister of the Netherlands; 1891–1894	Succeeded by Joan Röell
Preceded by Johan Willem Meinard Schorer	Queen's Commissioner of North Holland; 1897–1911	Succeeded by Wilhelmus Frederik van Leeuwen
