= Schokking =

Schokking is a Dutch surname. Notable people with the surname include:

- Jan Schokking (1864–1941), Dutch politician and minister
- Wim Schokking (1900–1960), Dutch politician
