= Dutch Council =

Dutch Council may refer to:

- Council of State (Netherlands), a constitutionally established advisory body to the government
- Dutch Jewish council, a council that was active during the German occupation of the Netherlands in World War II
