= Wim Schokking =

Dutch politician (1900–1960)

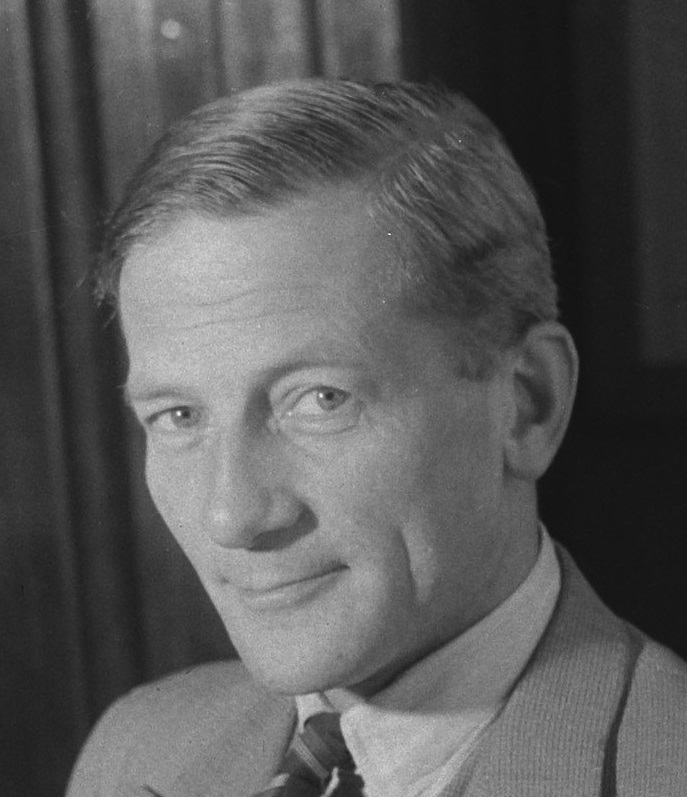
- Schokking in 1948

Member of the Council of State
- In office 15 February 1951 – 5 July 1960
- Vice President: Frans Beelaerts van Blokland (1951–1956); Bram Rutgers (1951–1959); Louis Beel (1959–1960)

Minister of War and the Navy
- In office 7 August 1948 – 16 October 1950
- Prime Minister: Willem Drees
- Preceded by: Alexander Fiévez
- Succeeded by: Hans s'Jacob

Personal details
- Born: Willem Frederik Schokking; 14 August 1900 Amsterdam, Netherlands
- Died: 5 July 1960 (aged 59) Amsterdam, Netherlands
- Party: Christian Historical Union
- Spouse: Emilie Marie Françoise Röell (m. 1937)
- Children: 2 daughters and 1 son
- Education: University of Amsterdam (Bachelor of Laws, Master of Laws)
- Occupation: Politician; Jurist; Lawyer; Judge; Prosecutor; Nonprofit director

Military service
- Allegiance: Netherlands
- Branch/service: Royal Netherlands Army
- Years of service: 1922–1924 (Conscription); 1924–1930 (Reserve)
- Rank: Lieutenant
- Unit: Artillery

Willem Frederik "Wim" Schokking (14 August 1900 – 5 July 1960) was a Dutch politician from the Christian Historical Union. He was Minister of War and Minister of Marine in the Drees-Van Schaik cabinet, from 1948 to 1950. In his tenure as Minister, he was responsible for the deployment of troops to Indonesia during Operation Kraai and their repatriation afterwards. From 1951 to 1960 he was member of the Council of State.
