= Gerlach Cornelis Joannes van Reenen =

Dutch politician

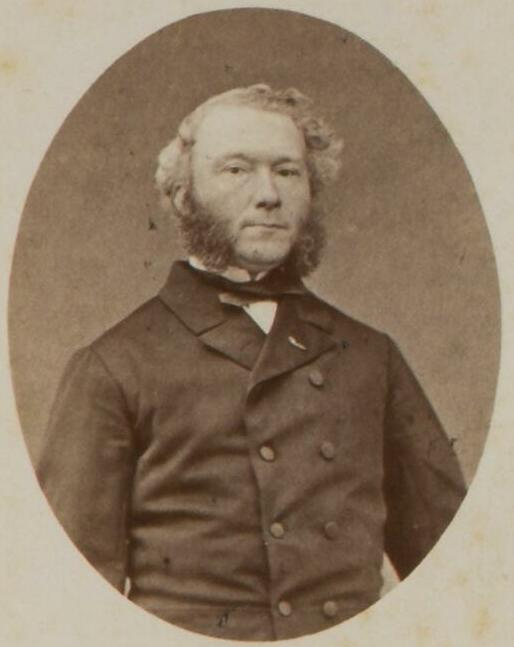
Gerlach Cornelis Joannes van Reenen in 1889

Jhr. Gerlach Cornelis Joannes van Reenen (30 September 1818, in Amsterdam – 31 May 1893, in The Hague) was a Dutch politician.

He was Mayor of Amsterdam from 1850 to 1853 and later a member of the House of Representatives of the Netherlands for Amsterdam. He served as Ministers of the Interior from 1853 to 1856. He was president of the House of Representatives of the Netherlands in the period 23 September 1858 – 20 September 1869. After being a minister he became a member of the Council of State serving as Vice-President from 1876 to 1893. In 1876 he became Jonkheer. With Van Reenen as vice-president the Council of State became regent in short periods in 1889 and 1890, because of the illness of king William III, who became increasingly demented and was not able to perform his duties.

After the passing of king William III, the heir, Wilhelmina, was underage, and he became chairman of the regency committee.

Political offices
Preceded by Willem Anne Schimmelpenninck van der Oye	Speaker of the House of Representatives; 1858–1869	Succeeded by Willem Hendrik Dullert
