= Vice-President of the Council of State (Netherlands) =

Vice-President of the Council of State of the Netherlands
- Vice-President van de Raad van State
- State Coat of arms of the Netherlands

- Flag of the Kingdom of the Netherlands

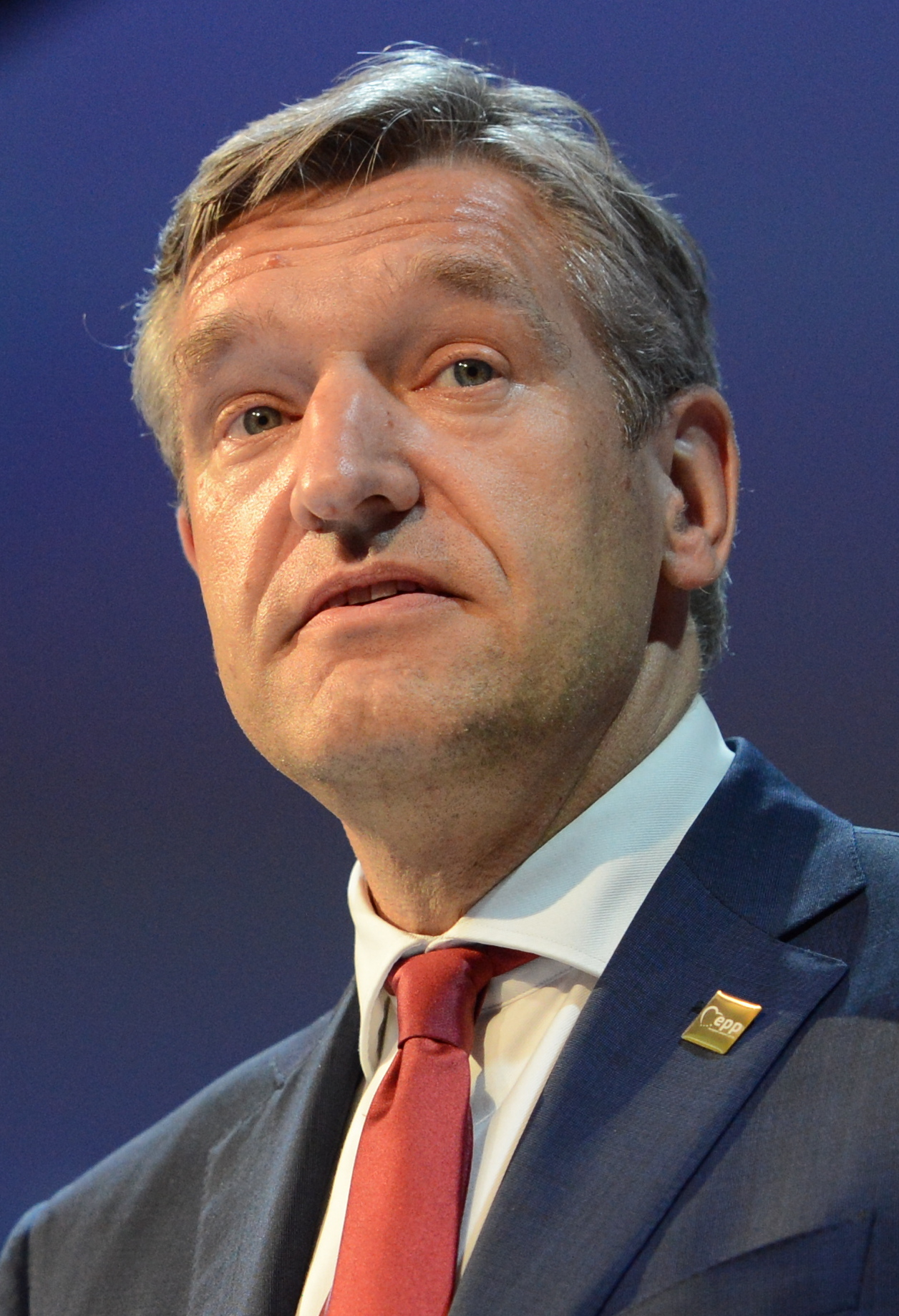
- Incumbent; Sybrand van Haersma Buma since 1 July 2026
- Member of: Council of State
- Nominator: Minister of the Interior and Kingdom Relations
- Appointer: Monarch
- Term length: Life tenure until the age of 70
- Formation: 12 April 1814; 212 years ago
- First holder: Gijsbert Karel van Hogendorp
- Unofficial names: Viceroy of the Netherlands
- Website: The Council of State

The vice-president of the Council of State (Dutch: Vice-President van de Raad van State) is the de facto presiding officer of the Council of State. The monarch serves as the ex officio president of the Council of State but in reality seldom chairs meetings, in his absence, the vice-president serves as pro tempore chair of those meetings. The vice-president is also in charge of the council's organisation and administrative duties. The Constitution of the Netherlands stipulates that if the royal house were to become extinct the vice-president will become the acting head of state. Like the other members of the Council of State the vice president is appointed by the monarch upon nomination by the minister of the interior and kingdom relations. The service of the vice-president is a life tenure appointment but is required by law to enter a mandatory retirement at the age of 70. Alternatively, an early retirement or a forced termination of his tenure can be given by the monarch in a royal decree.

The current vice-president of the Council of State is Sybrand van Haersma Buma.

== List of vice-presidents ==
Portrait	Name	Term of office	Party	Monarch	Ref
Gijsbert Karel van Hogendorp	Count; Gijsbert Karel van Hogendorp (1762–1834)	12 April 1814 – 7 November 1816 (2 years, 209 days)	Independent (pro-government)	King William I	
Johan Hendrik Mollerus	Baron; Johan Hendrik Mollerus (1750–1834)	7 November 1816 – 1 July 1829 (12 years, 236 days)	Independent (pro-government)	King William I	
William, Prince of Orange	His Royal Highness; William, Prince of Orange (1792–1849)	1 July 1829 – 7 October 1840 (19 years, 98 days)	Nonpartisan (Royal House)	King William I	
Vacant				King William II	
Henri van Doorn van Westcapelle	Dr. Baron; Henri van Doorn van Westcapelle (1786–1853)	1 January 1841 – 26 March 1848 (7 years, 85 days)	Independent; Conservative (ultraconservative)	King William II	
Willem Gerard van de Poll	Jonkheer; Willem Gerard van de Poll (1793–1872)	26 March 1848 – 1 April 1858 (10 years, 6 days)	Independent	King William II	
Willem Gerard van de Poll	Jonkheer; Willem Gerard van de Poll (1793–1872)	26 March 1848 – 1 April 1858 (10 years, 6 days)	Independent	King William III	
Vacant				King William III	
Aeneas Mackay	Baron; Aeneas Mackay (1806–1876)	1 July 1862 – 6 March 1876 (13 years, 249 days)	Independent; Antirevolutionary	King William III	
Vacant				King William III	
Gerlach Cornelis Joannes van Reenen	Jonkheer; Gerlach Cornelis; Joannes van Reenen (1818–1893)	1 April 1876 – 31 May 1893 (17 years, 60 days)	Independent; Conservative	King William III	
Gerlach Cornelis Joannes van Reenen	Jonkheer; Gerlach Cornelis; Joannes van Reenen (1818–1893)	1 April 1876 – 31 May 1893 (17 years, 60 days)	Independent; Conservative	Queen Wilhelmina	
Vacant				Queen Wilhelmina	
Bram van Panhuys	Jonkheer; Bram van Panhuys (1837–1907)	1 August 1893 – 1 January 1897 (3 years, 153 days)	Independent; Liberal	Queen Wilhelmina	
Vacant				Queen Wilhelmina	
Johan Willem Meinard Schorer	Jonkheer; Johan Willem; Meinard Schorer (1834–1903)	1 February 1897 – 1 October 1903 (6 years, 242 days)^{[Died]}	Independent; Liberal	Queen Wilhelmina	
Vacant				Queen Wilhelmina	
Petrus Johannes van Swinderen	Jonkheer; Petrus Johannes van Swinderen (1842–1911)	1 December 1903 – 19 December 1911 (8 years, 18 days)^{[Died]}	Christian Historical Party (until 1908)	Queen Wilhelmina	
Petrus Johannes van Swinderen	Jonkheer; Petrus Johannes van Swinderen (1842–1911)	1 December 1903 – 19 December 1911 (8 years, 18 days)^{[Died]}	Christian Historical Union (from 1908)	Queen Wilhelmina	
Vacant				Queen Wilhelmina	
Joan Röell	Jonkheer; Joan Röell (1844–1914)	1 February 1912 – 13 July 1914 (2 years, 162 days)^{[Died]}	League of Free Liberals	Queen Wilhelmina	
Vacant				Queen Wilhelmina	
Wilhelmus Frederik van Leeuwen	Dr. Wilhelmus Frederik van Leeuwen (1860–1930)	16 December 1914 – 18 April 1928 (13 years, 124 days)	Independent; Liberal (Conservative Liberal)	Queen Wilhelmina	
Vacant				Queen Wilhelmina	
Alex van Lynden van Sandenburg	Dr. Count; Alex van Lynden van Sandenburg (1873–1932)	1 May 1928 – 25 December 1932 (4 years, 238 days)^{[Died]}	Anti-Revolutionary Party	Queen Wilhelmina	
Vacant				Queen Wilhelmina	
Frans Beelaerts van Blokland	Jonkheer; Frans Beelaerts van Blokland (1872–1956)	20 April 1933 – 27 March 1956 (22 years, 342 days)^{[Died]}	Christian Historical Union	Queen Wilhelmina	
Frans Beelaerts van Blokland	Jonkheer; Frans Beelaerts van Blokland (1872–1956)	20 April 1933 – 27 March 1956 (22 years, 342 days)^{[Died]}	Christian Historical Union	Queen Juliana	
Vacant				Queen Juliana	
Bram Rutgers	Dr. Bram Rutgers (1884–1966)	16 May 1956 – 1 August 1959 (3 years, 77 days)	Anti-Revolutionary Party	Queen Juliana	
Louis Beel	Dr. Louis Beel (1902–1977)	1 August 1959 – 1 July 1972 (12 years, 335 days)	Catholic People's Party	Queen Juliana	
Vacant				Queen Juliana	
Marinus Ruppert	Marinus Ruppert (1911–1992)	1 September 1973 – 1 October 1980 (7 years, 30 days)	Anti-Revolutionary Party	Queen Juliana	
Marinus Ruppert	Marinus Ruppert (1911–1992)	1 September 1973 – 1 October 1980 (7 years, 30 days)	Anti-Revolutionary Party	Queen Beatrix	
Willem Scholten	Willem Scholten (1927–2005)	1 October 1980 – 1 July 1997 (16 years, 273 days)	Christian Historical Union (until 1980)	Queen Beatrix	
Willem Scholten	Willem Scholten (1927–2005)	1 October 1980 – 1 July 1997 (16 years, 273 days)	Christian Democratic Appeal (from 1980)	Queen Beatrix	
Herman Tjeenk Willink	Herman Tjeenk Willink (born 1942)	1 July 1997 – 1 February 2012 (14 years, 215 days)	Labour Party	Queen Beatrix	
Piet Hein Donner	Piet Hein Donner (born 1948)	1 February 2012 – 1 November 2018 (6 years, 273 days)	Christian Democratic Appeal	Queen Beatrix	
Piet Hein Donner	Piet Hein Donner (born 1948)	1 February 2012 – 1 November 2018 (6 years, 273 days)	Christian Democratic Appeal	King Willem-Alexander	
Thom de Graaf	Thom de Graaf (born 1957)	1 November 2018 – 1 July 2026 (7 years, 242 days)	Democrats 66	King Willem-Alexander	
Sybrand van Haersma Buma	Sybrand van Haersma Buma (born 1965)	1 July 2026 (69 days)	Christian Democratic Appeal	King Willem-Alexander	

^{Died in office.}

== See also ==
- Council of State (Netherlands)
- Monarchy of the Netherlands
