= Ahasverus van Nierop =

Dutch jurist and politician

Ahasverus Samuel van Nierop
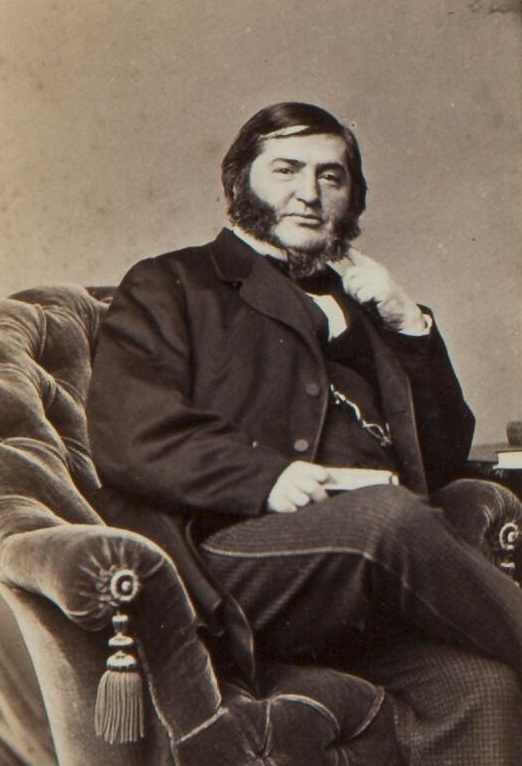

Member of House of Representatives for Hoorn
- In office 12 May 1852 – 26 April 1853

Member of House of Representatives for Haarlem
- In office 19 September 1864 – 1 October 1866

Personal details
- Born: 24 January 1813 Hoorn, Zuyderzée, First French Empire
- Died: 15 May 1878 (aged 65) Amsterdam, Kingdom of the Netherlands
- Resting place: Muiderberg
- Spouse: Rachel Salvador (m. 1843)
- Education: Leiden University

Ahasverus Samuel "Asser" van Nierop (Hebrew: אחשוורוש שמואל ואן נירופ; 24 January 1813 – 15 May 1878) was a Dutch Jewish jurist, politician and member of parliament.

== Biography ==
Van Nierop studied law at the Athenaeum Illustre of Amsterdam and received a Doctor of Law degree from Leiden University in 1839. He established himself as a prominent lawyer in Amsterdam, where he advocated for synagogue reform in the 1840s.

In 1851 he was elected member of the House of Representatives, but failed to secure reelection in 1853. He returned as a representative for the Haarlem district between 1864 and 1866. In 1870 he was elected member of the Amsterdam Municipal Council and in 1875 member of the Provincial Council of North Holland.

Nierop was president of the Centrale Commissie and of the Permanente Commissie, in which capacity he did much for the Jews in Holland, and served on the Nederlands Israëlitisch Kerkgenootschap. He wrote a large number of articles in the Weekblad voor het Recht and in Themis on commercial law, and was also a contributor to the Jaarboeken voor Israelieten in Nederland, signing his articles "N."
