= Bram Rutgers =

Dutch botanist and politician

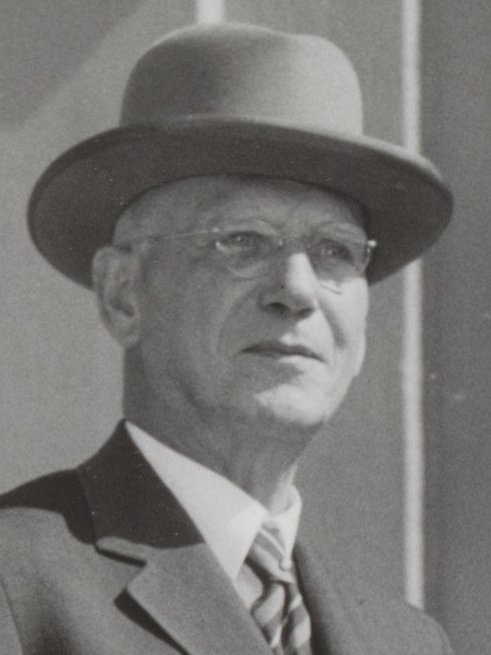
- Rutgers 1956

Vice-President of the Council of State
- In office 16 May 1956 – 1 August 1959

Council of State
- In office 21 January 1936 – 15 May 1940
- In office 5 May 1945 – 16 May 1956

House of Representatives
- In office 12 September 1933 – 21 January 1936

Governor-General of Suriname
- In office 30 May 1928 – 3 August 1933
- Preceded by: Aarnoud van Heemstra
- Succeeded by: Johannes Kielstra

Personal details
- Born: Abraham Arnold Lodewijk Rutgers; 24 July 1884; Amsterdam, Netherlands
- Died: 26 September 1966 (aged 82); Wassenaar, Netherlands
- Political party: Anti-Revolutionary Party (ARP)
- Occupation: botanist, politician

Abraham Arnold Lodewijk "Bram" Rutgers (24 July 1884 – 26 September 1966) was a Dutch botanist and politician who served as Governor-General of Suriname from 1928 until 1933, the Council of State from 1936 until 1959, and served as its Vice-President from 1956 onwards. He was a member of the Anti-Revolutionary Party (ARP).

== Biography ==
Rutgers was born on 24 July 1884 in Amsterdam, Netherlands. He wanted to study mathematics and physics, however his family belonged to the Christian Reformed Church which implied that he had to go to the Vrije Universiteit Amsterdam which did not teach physics, therefore, he also enlisted at the secular University of Amsterdam. In 1910, he obtained his doctorate in botany at Utrecht University.

After graduating, Rutgers left for Dutch East Indies (nowadays: Indonesia) to work for the Department of Agriculture. On 14 November 1910, he married the daughter of Alexander Idenburg who was the Gouvernor of the Dutch East Indies. Between 1916 and 1922, he served as the President of the experimental rubber station AVROS in Medan, Sumatra.

=== Suriname ===
On 20 January 1928, Rutgers was appointed Governor-General of Suriname, however he did not accept the nomination until 30 May. The Great Depression also caused an economic crisis in Suriname, and attempts to stimulate agriculture failed.

In December 1932, Anton de Kom, a communist who was born in Suriname, was told that his mother was very ill. Rutgers was notified of his arrival, and ordered a constant watch. On 1 February 1933, a planned meeting was cancelled after a large armed police force showed up. De Kom decided to go to Rutgers to complain, and was arrested on route. On 7 February, a large crowd gathered on Oranjeplein demanding de Kom's release. When the crowd refused to leave, the police opened fire, killing two people and wounding 22. On 10 May, de Kom was exiled to the Netherlands without trial.

In March 1933, Rutgers decided to run for the House of Representatives in the Netherlands. He was elected, and left for the Netherlands on 3 August. On 6 July 1933, Algemeen Handelsblad complimented Rutgers on lowering the deficit in Suriname despite an economic depression and less income. He served in parliament until 21 January 1936. He was subsequently appointed to the Council of State, the advisory council of the government.

=== World War II ===
After the German invasion of the Netherlands, Rutgers managed to persuade the German authority to keep the Administrative Dispute Division of the Council of State operational. In 1940, Dutch politicians were taken hostage as a reprisal for the internment of Germans in the Dutch colonies. In January 1941, Rutgers was interned at Kamp Schoorl, a political prisoner and transit camp. He was temporarily transferred to Buchenwald concentration camp when the German authority received word that German internees in Mariënburg, Suriname were not well treated. Rutgers was released in December 1942.

Starting in 1943, Rutgers served in the Vaderlandsch Comité, a resistance organisation headed by the later Prime Minister Willem Drees, which sent advice and intelligence to the Dutch government-in-exile.

=== Later life ===
Between 7 May 1945 and 15 September 1945, Rutgers was acting Queen's commissioner for the province of South Holland. In 1946, he led a government mission to the Dutch West Indies to evaluate the political situation. Between 1950 and 1953, Rutgers was a member of the Van Schaik Commission which was tasked to make a general review of the Constitution of the Netherlands. On 16 May 1956, he was appointed Vice-President of the Council of State. He retired on 1 August 1959.

Rutgers died on 26 September 1966 in Wassenaar, at the age of 82.

== Honours ==
- Netherlands Commander in the Order of Orange Nassau.
- Netherlands Commander in the Order of the Netherlands Lion.
- France Commander in the Legion of Honour.
- Luxembourg Grand Cross in the Order of the Oak Crown.
- Belgium Grand Cross in the Order of the Crown.
