= Joan Röell =

Dutch nobleman and statesman (1844–1914)

His Excellency, Jonkheer Joan Röell
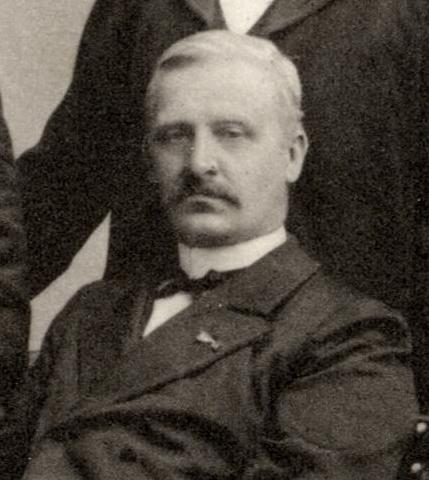

Chairman of the Council of Ministers
- In office 9 May 1894 – 27 July 1897
- Monarch: Wilhelmina
- Regent: Emma
- Preceded by: Gijsbert van Tienhoven
- Succeeded by: Nicolaas Pierson

Personal details
- Born: Joan Röell; 21 July 1844 Haarlem, Netherlands
- Died: 13 July 1914 (aged 69) The Hague, Netherlands
- Party: Free Liberal
- Spouse: Eritia Erna Romelia de Beaufort
- Occupation: Lawyer

Jonkheer Joan Röell (21 July 1844 – 13 July 1914) was a Dutch nobleman, lawyer and statesman. He was a member of a prominent Dutch noble family which produced many public administrators, and politicians.

From 1894 to 1897 Röell headed the Dutch government as Chairman of the Council of Ministers and Minister of Foreign Affairs.

== Early life and education ==
Röell was born in Haarlem, to Herman Hendrik, Baron Röell (1806–1883), member (1842) and registrar (1843–1858) of the Provincial Council of North Holland, King's Commissioner of Utrecht (1858–1860) and of North Holland (1860–1879), curator of the University of Utrecht (1859–1883), and his wife Elisabeth van de Poll (1808–1862).

He attended a boarding school in Sassenheim, and later a gymnasium in Utrecht. From 1861 to 23 November 1866, he studied Roman and Contemporary Law at Utrecht University, after which he briefly worked as a lawyer.

== Political career ==
As a former registrar of the Provincial Council of South Holland, Röell was familiar with the intricacies of local and regional government and water management. In 1877, he was elected into the House of Representatives for the district of Utrecht. He was re-elected in 1881 and 1884, but lost his seat to Æneas, Baron Mackay in 1886. He became a member of the Senate for Zeeland until he won back his seat in the House from Mackay in 1888. He was re-elected again in 1891. In the House, he was concerned with various policy areas, including education, water management, health, constitutional amendment, suffrage, home affairs, Indian affairs and taxes.

After the 1894 general election, Röell became formateur, and formed a liberal cabinet in which he served as Minister of Foreign Affairs. He also became the chairman of the Council of Ministers, a position that would later be dubbed Prime Minister. In 1886, his cabinet greatly expanded suffrage, doubling the electorate.

In 1897, after finishing his term, he stood for election to the House of Representatives again, but was not elected, and returned to the Senate one year later. In 1901, Röell returned to House of Representatives for the district of Utrecht II. After his re-election in 1905, he served as Speaker of the House of Representatives, until he lost his seat in 1909. After another stint in the Senate for North Holland, from 1910 to 1912, Röell was appointed Vice-President of the Council of State. Röell died on 13 July 1914 in The Hague, eight days before his 70th birthday, and was buried in the family vault in Leusden three days later.

== Private life ==
Röell married Jonkvrouw Eritia Ena Romelia de Beaufort (1843–1910) in Utrecht on 10 September 1868. The couple remained childless.

== Notes ==
House of Representatives of the Netherlands
Preceded by Jan Messchert van Vollenhoven	Member for Utrecht; 1877–1886; With: Jacob Nicolaas Bastert 1877–1884; Jan Schimmelpenninck van der Oye 1884–1886	Succeeded by Æneas Mackay
Preceded by Æneas Mackay	Member for Utrecht; 1888–1894; With: August Seyffardt 1888–1891; Hendrik Adriaan van Beuningen 1891–1894	Succeeded by Abraham van Karnebeek
Preceded by Jacob Nicolaas Bastert	Member for Utrecht II; 1901–1909	Succeeded by Jan van Hoogstraten
Political offices
Preceded by Joannes Coenraad Jansen	Minister of Foreign Affairs; 1894–1897	Succeeded by Willem Hendrik de Beaufort
Preceded by Gijsbert van Tienhoven	Chairman of the Council of Ministers; 1894–1897	Succeeded by Nicolaas Pierson
Preceded by Æneas Mackay	Speaker of the House of Representatives; 1905–1909	Succeeded by Frederik van Bylandt
Preceded by Petrus Johannes van Swinderen	Vice-President of the Council of State; 1912–1914	Succeeded by Wilhelmus Frederik van Leeuwen
