= Hans s'Jacob =

Dutch politician (1906–1967)

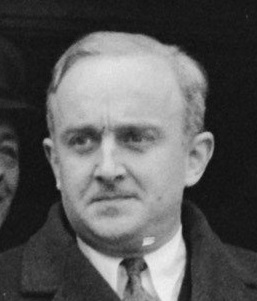
- s'Jacob in 1951

Minister of War and the Navy
- In office 16 October 1950 – 15 March 1951
- Prime Minister: Willem Drees
- Preceded by: Wim Schokking
- Succeeded by: Kees Staf

Mayor of Valburg
- In office 5 May 1945 – 1 December 1945
- Preceded by: J.W. Visser
- Succeeded by: Godert Alexander Frederik van Lynden
- In office 1 March 1939 – 22 November 1943
- Preceded by: Everard Juste Lewe van Aduard
- Succeeded by: J.W. Visser

Personal details
- Born: Hendrik Laurentius s'Jacob; 5 April 1906 Driebergen, Netherlands
- Died: 29 September 1967 (aged 61) Leiden, Netherlands
- Party: Independent Christian Democrat
- Other political affiliations: Christian Historical Union (Non affiliated sympathizer)
- Education: Utrecht University (Bachelor of Laws, Master of Laws)
- Occupation: Politician; Civil servant; Jurist; Economist; Academic administrator; Nonprofit director

Hendrik Laurentius "Hans" s'Jacob (5 April 1906 - 29 September 1967) was a Dutch politician. He succeeded Wim Schokking as Minister of Defence in the Drees–Van Schaik cabinet from October 1950.
