= Council of State (Netherlands) =

Highest court and government advisory body of the Netherlands

- Raad van State
- Kneuterdijk Palace in The Hague
- Interactive map of Council of State
- 52.081482°N 4.308911°E
- Established: 1 October 1531
- Jurisdiction: Kingdom of the Netherlands
- Location: The Hague, Netherlands
- Coordinates: 52.081482°N 4.308911°E
- Authorised by: Constitution
- Website: https://www.raadvanstate.nl

President
- Currently: King Willem-Alexander
- Since: 30 April 2013

Vice President
- Currently: Sybrand van Haersma Buma
- Since: 1 July 2026

The Council of State (Dutch: Raad van State) is a constitutionally established advisory body in the Netherlands to the government and States General that officially consists of members of the royal family and Crown-appointed members generally having political, commercial, diplomatic or military experience. It was founded in 1531, making it one of the world's oldest still-functioning state organisations.

The Advisory Division of the Council of State must be consulted by the cabinet on proposed legislation before a law is submitted to parliament. The Administrative Jurisdiction Division of the Council of State also serves as one of the four highest courts of appeal in administrative matters. The King is president of the Council of State but he seldom chairs meetings. The Vice-President of the Council of State chairs meetings in his absence and is the de facto major personality of the institution. Under Dutch constitutional law, the Vice-President of the Council is acting head of state when there is no monarch such as if the royal family were to become extinct.

== History ==
=== Habsburg Netherlands ===
Charles V, Holy Roman Emperor, founded a Council of State on 1 October 1531 as one of three Collateral Councils (the other two were the Privy Council or Secret Council and the Council of Finances) to advise his sister Mary of Hungary, his regent in the Habsburg Netherlands, and her successors, on "the great and principal affairs and those which concern the state, conduct and government of the lands, security and defense of the said lands here". Members of the council were the great nobles of the realm and a few of the great prelates.

After the accession of Philip II of Spain to the throne and his departure to Spain in 1559 the Council became the forum for the strife between the Spanish representatives in the Council, led by Antoine Perrenot de Granvelle, and the Netherlandish grandees like the Prince of Orange and the Counts of Horne and Egmont. The latter faction felt themselves pushed aside and resigned in 1567, leaving the field to a Spanish-dominated Council at the start of the Dutch Revolt. After the death of Luis de Requesens y Zúñiga, then governor-general of the Habsburg Netherlands, in 1576, the Council of State temporarily assumed his authority as representative of king Philip, awaiting the arrival of the new governor-general, Don Juan. Before he could arrive, the members of the Council were arrested in a coup by the Brussels garrison. Soon afterwards the Pacification of Ghent was concluded, pitting the States-General of the Netherlands against the Spanish crown, represented by Don Juan. When the latter retreated to Namur in early 1577, the Council of State split into two rumps, one joining Don Juan (and forming the nucleus of what would become the Council of State of the Spanish Netherlands and later the Austrian Netherlands), the other remaining close to the rebellious States-General. These members were discharged by King Philip in 1578, formally ending the Council as a Habsburg institution in what was to become the Dutch Republic.

=== Under Anjou and Leicester ===
When the Duke of Anjou came to be temporarily recognized as the new sovereign of the rebellious provinces in 1581, a new Council of State was appointed to advise him and to perform certain executive duties, pertaining to defense and finances. This Council soon split in two regional councils, one for the area West of the river Meuse, the other for the area East of that river. The first, residing in Antwerp where the States-General also convened, played the main role up to the departure of the Duke. After his departure the (again unified) Council followed the States-General to Middelburg, Delft, and The Hague.

After the assassination of the Prince of Orange in 1584 the Council was given new executive powers and temporarily assumed full executive authority in the place of the Prince. The States-General meanwhile took the lead in the search for another protecting sovereign. This resulted in the Treaty of Nonsuch of 1585 with Elizabeth I of England that explicitly assumed a leading role of the Council in the evolving constitution of the provinces of the Union of Utrecht. Article XIV of the treaty authorised Elizabeth to appoint two English representatives on the Council, besides the Governor-General, who would preside the council.

The next articles gave far-reaching authority to the Governor-General, acting with the council, in matters of defense, finance and government. For instance, the Stadtholders of the provinces would henceforth be appointed by the Governor-General and the Council (art. XXIV), though the States of Holland and West Friesland preempted this by appointing Maurice, Prince of Orange stadtholder before the Earl of Leicester, who would accept the Governor-Generalship, conferred on him by the States-General against the wish of Elizabeth, arrived in the Netherlands. This was the first instance of the way the mighty province of Holland frustrated the policies of Leicester. His attempt to found a new Council of Finances (the old one had been dissolved in 1580), which was supposed to take a number of the financial powers of the Council of State, was quietly thwarted.

On the instigation of the Land's Advocate of Holland, Johan van Oldenbarnevelt, who was a member of the Council, more and more executive tasks of the Council were taken over by the States-General, to dilute English influence on the Dutch affairs of state. These tasks and this influence of the Council did not return after Leicester had left the Netherlands at the end of 1587.

=== Under the Dutch Republic ===
By 1588 the Council had therefore reached the structure and functions it would possess during the entire existence of the Dutch Republic. The Council was henceforth made up of members appointed by the States-General on the nomination of the Provincial States (usually about 12), with two members (between 1598 and 1625 one) appointed by the English government. The stadtholders of the provinces were ex officio members, at least outside the First Stadtholderless Period and Second Stadtholderless Period. The executive powers of the Council were limited to military policy (both on land and sea); administering the Dutch States Army's financial aspects (naval affairs were administered by the five Admiralties, founded by Leicester); and formulating and executing tax policy for the Generality Lands.

The Council usually played a self-effacing role, as laid down in its Instruction of 1651, at the beginning of the first Stadtholderless Period. However, the secretary of the Council, Simon van Slingelandt played a leading role in an attempt at constitutional reform (which would have greatly increased the executive powers of the Council, as intended in the time of Leicester) in 1717. This attempt came to nothing, however.

After the overthrow of the regime of stadtholder William V, Prince of Orange and the founding of the Batavian Republic in 1795, the Council was dissolved, together with the States-General.

=== Under the Kingdom of the Netherlands ===
An advisory council with the name Council of State was again instituted in the waning days of the Batavian Republic in 1805. The successor Kingdom of Holland had an institution with that name (modeled on the contemporary French Council of State). Despite this, these councils disappeared again during the years of the annexation by France (1810–1813). However, after the restoration of Dutch independence in 1813 a new Council of State was founded as laid down in the Constitutions of 1814 and 1815. These constitutions explicitly stated that all "Acts of Sovereign Dignity" by the Sovereign Prince (and later the King) would only be enacted after the advice of the Council was heard. These included both Acts of the States-General and Royal Decrees, which was important because the first king, William I of the Netherlands, liked to rule by decree. The King presided over the new Council, and the Crown-Prince became a member ex officio after reaching the age of majority. In practice, however, a vice-president presided over the deliberations of the Council, the King took over on ceremonial occasions. Members were appointed from all provinces both "Dutch" and "Belgian". After the Belgian Revolution of 1830 the Belgian members left. The new Kingdom of Belgium did not institute its own Council of State until 1946 as an administrative court.

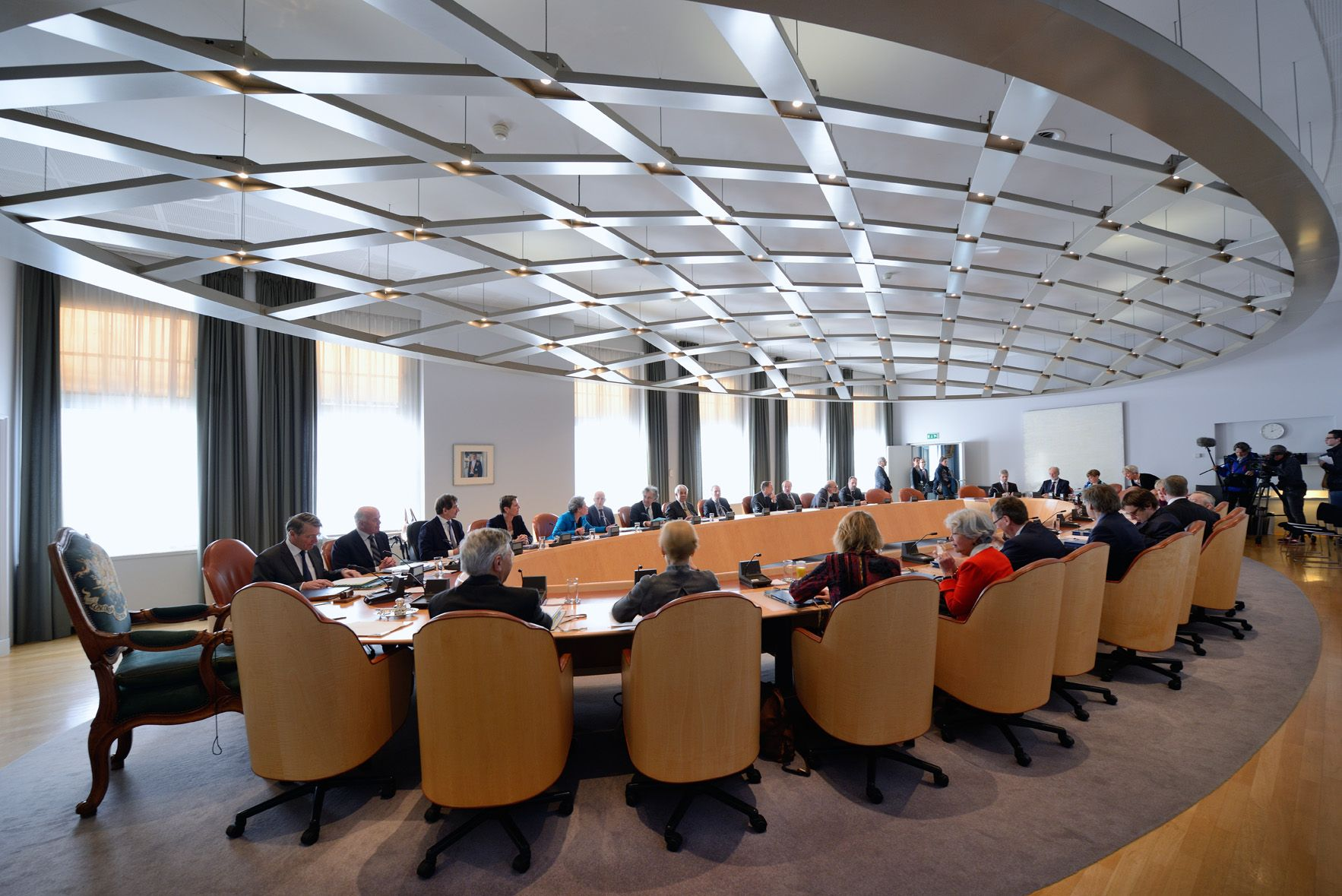
The Council of State's meeting room in the Binnenhof; the King's chair (left) is empty

Under the 1848 constitution, the Council of State was reorganized, and its structure and duties were defined by a new law. The first of these laws, passed in 1861, expanded the Council’s role: in addition to advising on legislation, it would also help resolve disputes between government bodies like provinces and municipalities that were brought before the Crown. For this type of advice a new subdivision of the Council was formed that came to act like an administrative court (though the formal decision rested with the Crown). This function of high administrative court was enlarged in the succeeding century. Finally, the 1861 law made the Council the institution that would exercise royal authority in the absence of the king or a regent. This case did happen for short periods in 1889 and 1890, in those periods the Council served as regent for King William III under the Vice-President Gerlach Cornelis Joannes van Reenen.

In 1887 the revised constitution opened the way for making the Council a formal administrative court. This did not actually happen before 1963 when the Wet Beroep Administratieve Beschikkingen (BAB, Administrative Decisions Review Act) was enacted, replaced in 1976 by the Wet Administratief Beroep Overheidsbeschikkingen (AROB, Administrative Decisions Appeals Act). This setup was changed in 1988, because the European Court of Human Rights had deemed in Benthem v Netherlands that the fact that the Council of State was not an independent institution denied the complainant a fair trial, in breach of Article 6 of the European Convention on Human Rights. To permanently remedy this defect the "judicial" part of the Council was in 1994 made formally independent from the part that advised on legislative matters. This split in two separate parts was confirmed in the most recent revision (2010) of the Council of State Act.

== Membership ==
The Council of State consists of three ex officio members, seven members, three State Councillors of the Kingdom, fifty State Councillors and fourteen Extraordinary State Councillors.

Ex officio members
Portrait	Member	Appointed	Operation of law reason
King Willem-Alexander	King Willem-Alexander (born 1967)	27 April 1985 (41 years, 66 days)	Heir apparent (1985–2013); King (since 2013)
Queen Máxima	Queen Máxima (born 1971)	2 February 2002 (24 years, 150 days)	Spouse of the heir apparent (2002–2013); Queen consort (since 2013)
Princess Catharina-Amalia	Catharina-Amalia, Princess of Orange (born 2003)	8 December 2021 (4 years, 206 days)	Heir apparent

Members
Portrait	Member	Appointed	Party	Background	Notes
Sybrand van Haersma Buma	Sybrand van Haersma Buma (born 1965)	1 July 2026 (1 day)	CDA	Politician (MP · Mayor)	Vice-President
	Dr. Rosa Uylenburg (born 1963)	1 January 2024 (2 years, 182 days)	Independent	Jurist	Chair of the Administrative Jurisdiction Division
	Dr. Guus Heerma van Voss (born 1957)	1 April 2012 (14 years, 92 days)	Independent	Jurist (Researcher · Law professor)	Member
	Dr. Hanna Sevenster (born 1963)	1 June 2007 (19 years, 31 days)	Independent	Jurist (Lawyer · Law professor); Civil servant	Member
	Ronald van den Tweel (born 1964)	24 June 2015 (11 years, 8 days)	Independent	Jurist (Lawyer)	Member
	Luc Verhey (born 1960)	1 March 2011 (15 years, 123 days)	Independent	Jurist (Law professor); Civil servant	Member
	Ben Vermeulen (born 1957)	1 February 2008 (18 years, 151 days)	Independent	Jurist (Law professor)	Member

=== Vice-Presidents ===
Name	Period
Gijsbert Karel van Hogendorp	1814–1816
Johan Hendrik Mollerus	1817–1829
William, Prince of Orange	1829–1840
Hendrik Jacob van Doorn van Westcapelle	1841–1848
Willem Gerard van de Poll	1848–1858
Æneas Mackay	1862–1876
Gerlach Cornelis Joannes van Reenen	1876–1893
Johan Æmilius Abraham van Panhuys	1893–1897
Johan Willem Meinard Schorer	1897–1903
Peter Joannes van Swinderen	1903–1912
Joan Röell	1912–1914
Wilhelmus Frederik van Leeuwen	1914–1928
Fredrik Alexander Carel van Lynden van Sandenburg	1928–1932
Frans Beelaerts van Blokland	1933–1956
Bram Rutgers	1956–1959
Louis Beel	1959–1972
Marinus Ruppert	1973–1980
Willem Scholten	1980–1997
Herman Tjeenk Willink	1997–2012
Piet Hein Donner	2012–2018
Thom de Graaf	2018–2026
Sybrand van Haersma Buma	2026–present

== Sources ==
- Israel, J.I. (1995), The Dutch Republic: Its Rise, Greatness and Fall, 1477-1806, Oxford University Press, ISBN 0-19-873072-1 hardback, ISBN 0-19-820734-4 paperback
- (in Dutch) Geschiedenis Raad van State
