= Æneas Mackay Jr. =

Dutch politician (1838–1909)

His Excellency The Baron Mackay
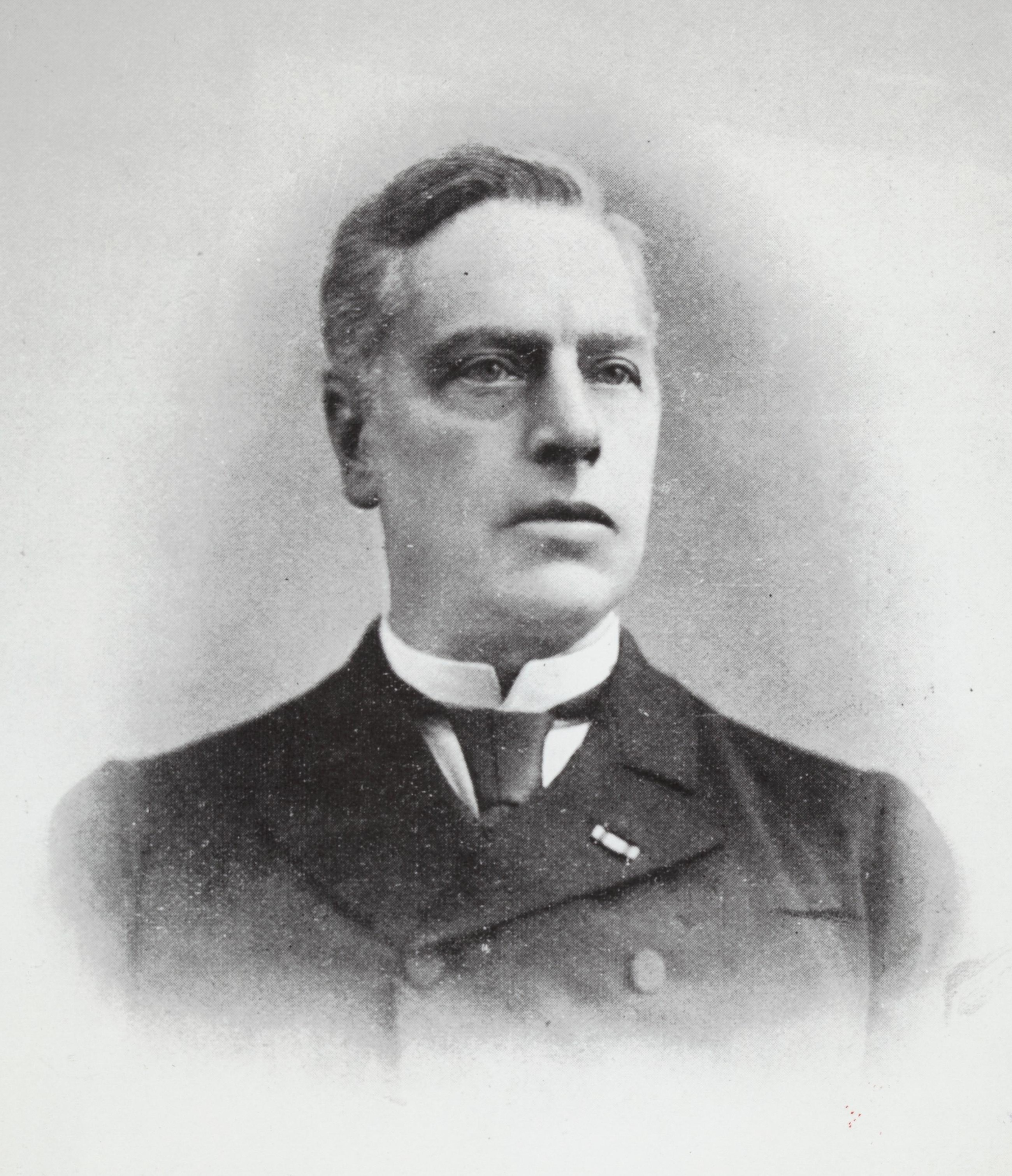
- Mackay c. 1901

Chairman of the Council of Ministers
- In office 20 April 1888 – 21 August 1891
- Monarchs: William III; Wilhelmina
- Regent: Emma
- Preceded by: Jan Heemskerk
- Succeeded by: Gijsbert van Tienhoven

Personal details
- Born: Æneas Mackay; 29 November 1838 Nijmegen, United Kingdom of the Netherlands
- Died: 13 November 1909 (aged 70) The Hague, Netherlands
- Party: Anti-Revolutionary
- Spouse: Maria Catharina Anna Fagel
- Children: 1
- Occupation: Lawyer, politician
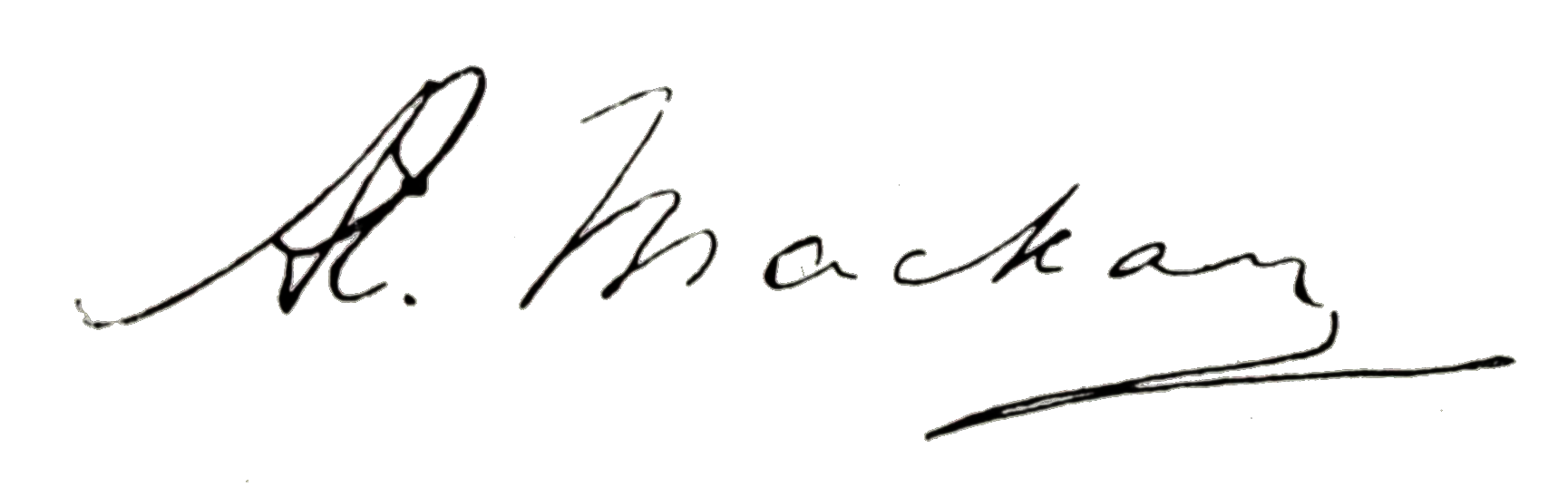
- Signature

Æneas, Baron Mackay (Dutch pronunciation: [ˈeːneːjɑs mɑˈkaːi]; 29 November 1838 – 13 November 1909) was a Dutch Anti-Revolutionary politician who served as Chairman of the Council of Ministers from 1888 to 1891. Born into a noble family from Gelderland, he studied law in Utrecht and worked as lawyer and a judge. He was elected into the House of Representatives in 1876, and retained his seat for twelve years before his premiership. In his cabinet, he served as minister of the Interior and minister of Colonial Affairs. After another thirteen years in the House, he became a member of the Council of State, receiving the honorary title Minister of State.

== Early life ==
Mackay was born in Nijmegen on 29 November 1839, into a noble family of Scottish origin. His parents were Johan François Hendrik Jacob Ernestus Mackay, a member of the Provincial Council of Gelderland and the brother of the 10th Lord Reay, and his wife Margaretha Clara Françoise van Lynden. At the age of six, he was among the first 116 students of De Klokkenberg, the first particular school in the area, which was established primarily at the hands of his father, despite enduring opposition from the municipal and provincial governments. He received secondary education at the Latin school in Nijmegen.

Mackay moved to Utrecht in 1856 in order to study Roman and Contemporary Law. He left University on 27 November 1862 after defending his dissertation "The exclusion of clergy and ministers of Religion in the Legislature in accordance with art. 91 of the Constitution", after which he settled back in Nijmegen as a lawyer. He became deputy registrar in Arnhem in 1865, deputy prosecutor in Zwolle in 1867, and judge in 1873.

== Political career ==
Mackay twice failed to get elected as Member of Parliament, for Nijmegen in 1873 and for Zutphen in 1875. On 4 April 1876, he was elected as a member of the House of Representatives for Amersfoort, defeating the liberal Willem Hendrik de Beaufort. In the House, he was concerned with a variety of policy areas, including justice, education, colonies and suffrage; in his first speech, he defended particular education and reform of the Elections Act. In 1883, he and three other MPs introduced a bill that would reduce the regulation imposed by the Lower Education Act, but the bill was fell due after a less far-reaching bill was passed the following year. In 1884, Mackay was elected Speaker of House of Representatives, obtaining 41 of 82 votes. He lost re-election as Speaker to Eppo Cremers the following year. In 1886, Mackay and five other MPs introduced an amendment to the education provision in the constitutional amendment proposed by the cabinet. After the cabinet failed to meet the Anti-Revolutionaries' demands regarding education and the constitutional amendment failed to pass the House, the cabinet resigned. In the subsequent election, Mackay was elected in both Amersfoort and Utrecht, and he chose to sit in the House for the latter.

Two years later, after the right won a parliamentary majority in the 1888 general election, Mackay was appointed as formateur, tasked with composing a cabinet. On 20 April, Mackay became Chairman of the Council of Ministers. In his own cabinet, he served as Minister of the Interior. The school struggle was the most important issue for the cabinet. In 1889, the cabinet amended the Lower Education Act, improving the position of particular education. From then on, particular schools would receive subsidy on the same footing as public schools, and a new tax on school fees for municipal schools would allow particular schools to compete with public ones. In 1890, after his budget failed to pass through the Senate, Levinus Wilhelmus Christiaan Keuchenius resigned, and Mackay succeeded him as Minister of Colonial Affairs. A year later, a bill regarding military organisation failed to pass through the House, opposed by many Catholics, and the cabinet resigned on 21 Augustus 1891.

A years after the end of his premiership, Mackay returned to the House of Representatives for Kampen, although he refrained from leading his party in the House. He declined taking part in the cabinet of Abraham Kuyper in 1901. He was elected for another term as Speaker of the House in the same year. He was one of the Anti-Revolutionary to vote against Johannes Tak van Poortvliet's constitutional amendment. After this constitutional amendment caused some Anti-Revolutionaries to split off and found the Christian Historical Union, Mackay left some ambiguity over his alignment. He remained Speaker until 1905, when he chose not to stand for re-election in the general election. In his last years, Mackay was a member of Council of State. He died in The Hague on 13 November 1909, at the age of 70.

== Private life ==
Mackay married Elisabeth Wilhelmina, Baroness van Lynden in Nijmegen on 7 July 1869. They had one son, Eric, Baron Mackay, who inherited the Scottish peerage Lord Reay from his great-granduncle.

House of Representatives of the Netherlands
Preceded by Jan Willem van Loon	Member for Amersfoort; 1876–1886	Succeeded by Levinus Keuchenius
Preceded by Joan Röell	Member for Utrecht; 1886–1888	Succeeded by Joan Röell
Preceded by Maarten Noordtzij	Member for Kampen; 1892–1905	Succeeded by Klaas Reyne
Political offices
Preceded by Eppo Cremers	Speaker of the House of Representatives; 1884–1885	Succeeded by Eppo Cremers
Preceded by Jan Heemskerk	Chairman of the Council of Ministers; 1888–1891	Succeeded by Gijsbert van Tienhoven
Preceded by Jan Heemskerk	Minister of the Interior; 1888–1890	Succeeded by Alexander de Savornin Lohman
Preceded by Levinus Keuchenius	Minister of Colonial Affairs; 1890–1891	Succeeded by Willem Karel van Dedem
Preceded by Johan George Gleichman	Speaker of the House of Representatives; 1901–1905	Succeeded by Joan Röell
