= Wilhelmus Frederik van Leeuwen =

Dutch politician (1860–1930)

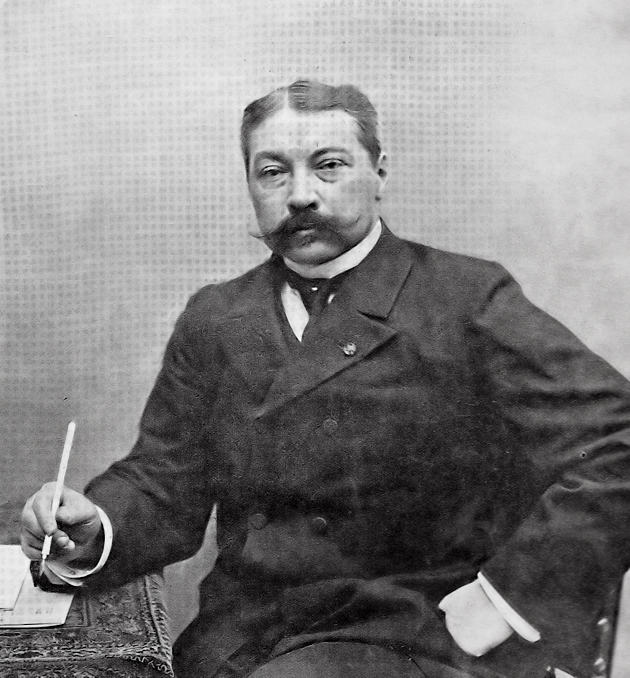
Van Leeuwen in 1907

Wilhelmus Frederik van Leeuwen (18 April 1860 – 6 September 1930) was a Dutch politician and Mayor of Amsterdam between 1901 and 1910. Born in The Hague, he studied at the University of Amsterdam and led the student union there. Leaving with a law doctorate, he moved to Amsterdam to practice law. As well as being the mayor of Amsterdam, he was the first Vice-President of the Council of State to not be a member of the nobility.

Political offices
Preceded by Sjoerd Vening Meinesz	Mayor of Amsterdam; 1901–1910	Succeeded by Antonie Röell
Preceded by Joan Röell	Vice-President of the Council of State; 1914–1928	Succeeded by Alex van Lynden van Sandenburg
