= Karel Antonie Godin de Beaufort =

Dutch politician (1850–1921)

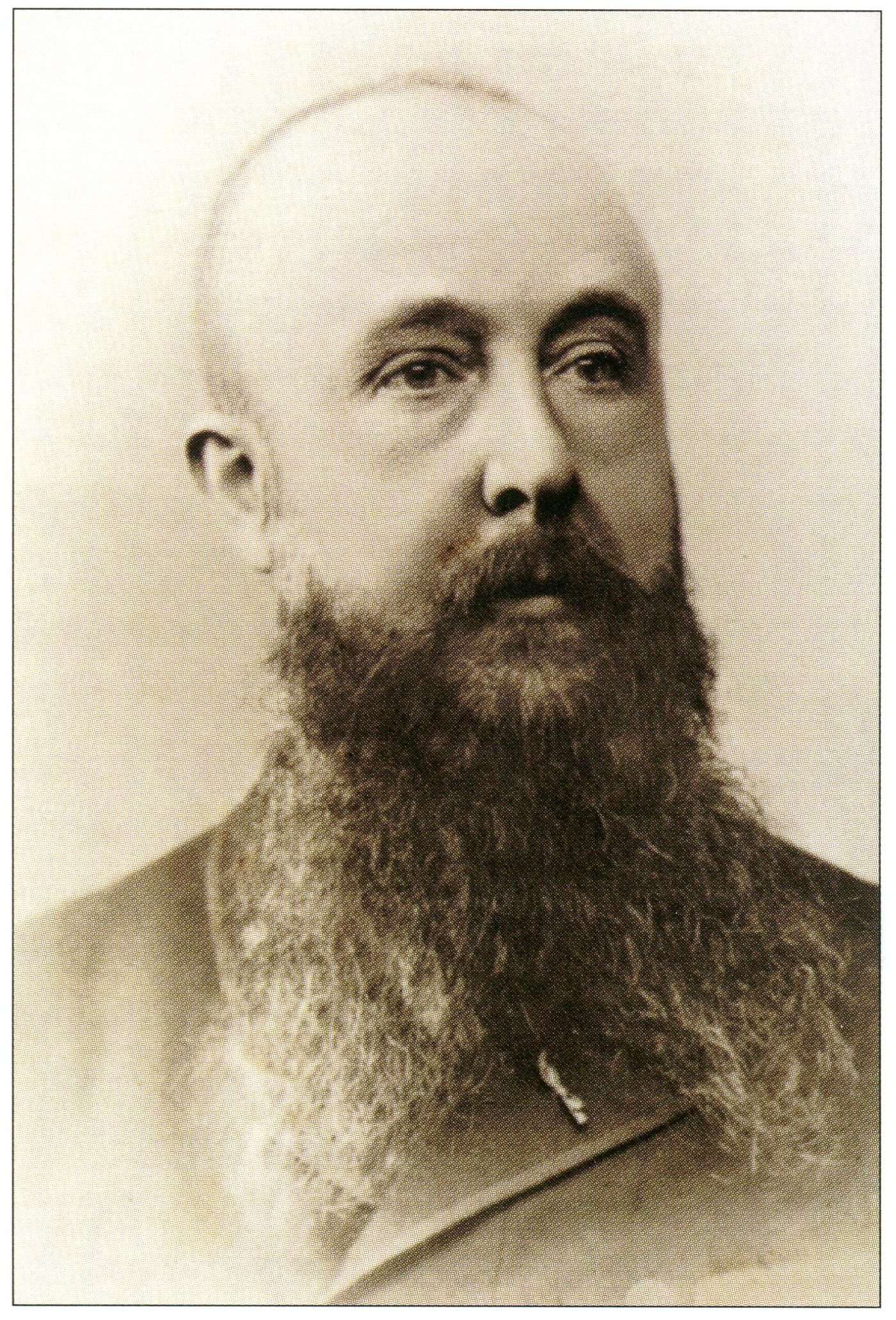
Karel Antonie Godin de Beaufort

Karel Anthonie Godin de Beaufort (16 January 1850, Utrecht – 7 April 1921, Maarsbergen) was a Dutch politician.
