= List of mayors of Amsterdam =

Mayor of Amsterdam
- Burgemeester van Amsterdam

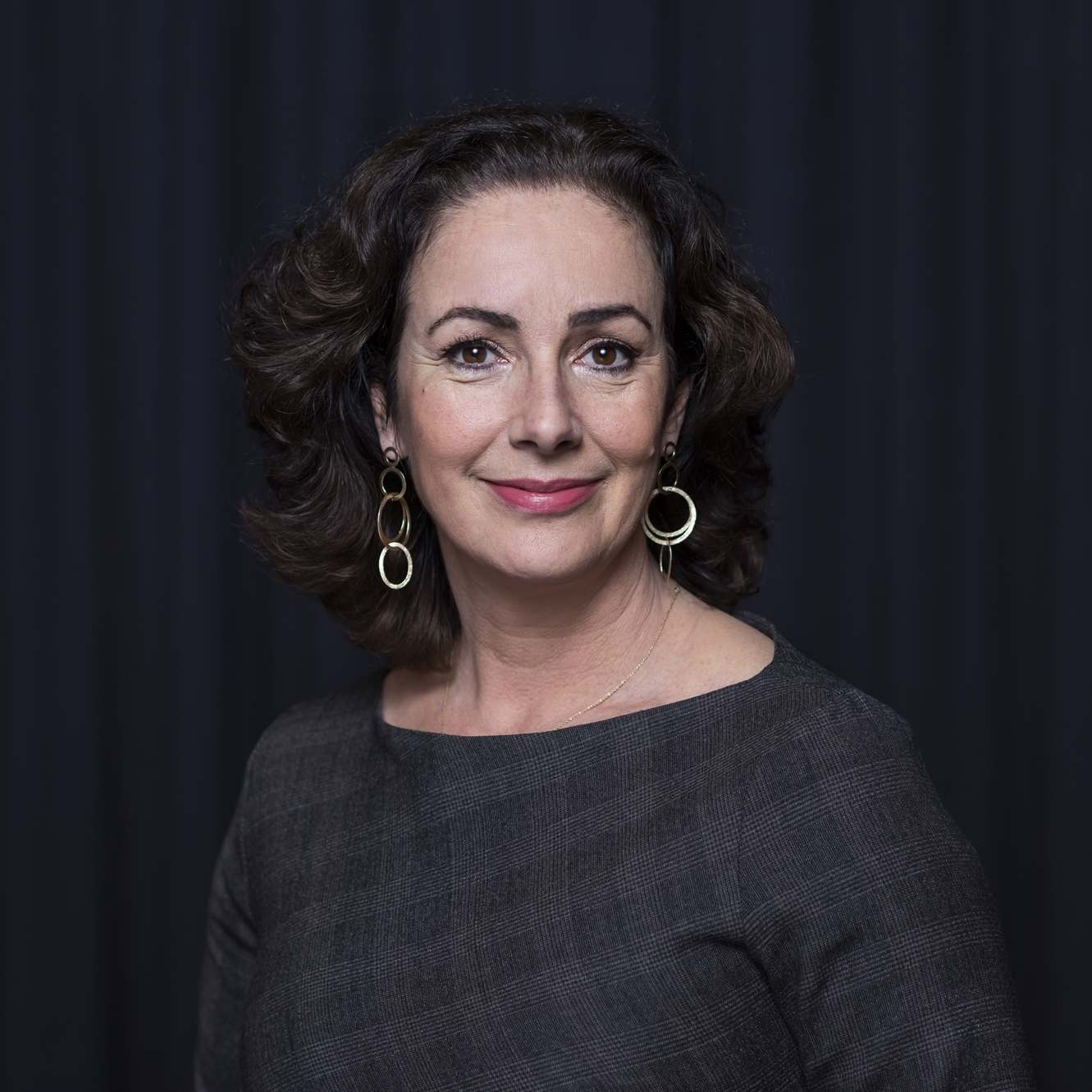
- Incumbent; Femke Halsema since 2018
- Seat: Herengracht 502
- Appointer: Gemeenteraad of Amsterdam
- Term length: 6 years
- Inaugural holder: Godevaert Wormbouts
- Formation: 1343
- Website: https://www.amsterdam.nl/en/governance/the-college-of-mayor-and-alderpersons/

Below is a list of mayors of Amsterdam (Dutch: burgemeesters), capital of the Netherlands. The city had four burgomasters, serving four years. Since 1389 the mayors were elected on 1 February. In the 17th and 18th century, a new mayor was elected by his colleagues (co-option), but his appointment had to be approved by the stadtholder. In 1824, it was decided only one person could govern the cities of The Hague and Amsterdam at a time. Mayors of Dutch municipalities are appointed by the municipal council after the acceptance of the King's Commissioner of the province.

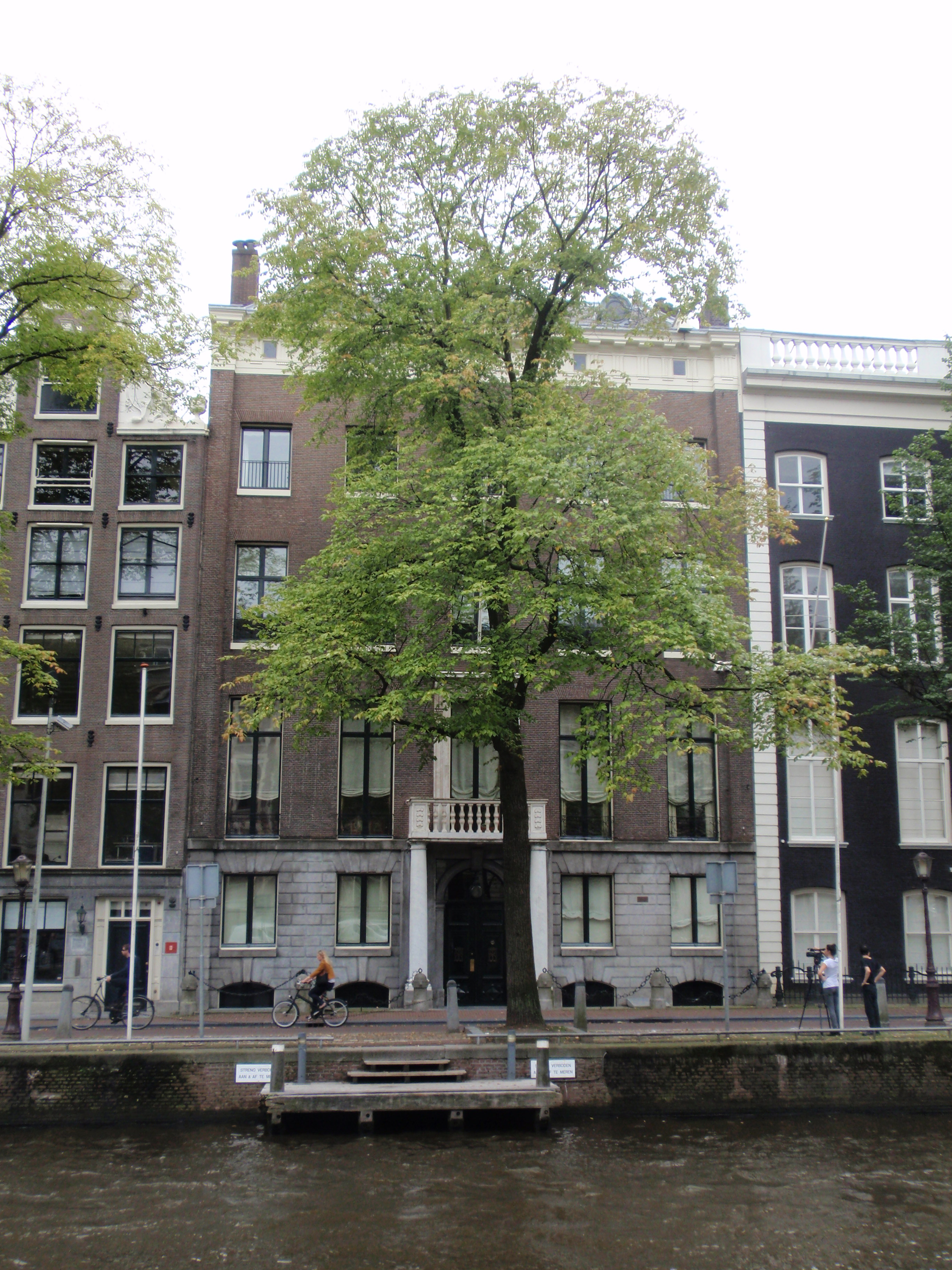
The House with the Columns, also known as the Deutzhuis, has been the official residence of the mayor of Amsterdam since 1927. The building was built by Paulus Godin in 1672 and is located at Herengracht 502.

== 14th century ==
- (1383) – Jacob Coppenszn

== 15th century ==
- (1413–1416) – Paul Oosterloo
- (1413, 1416) – Franke van der Vorm
- (1413–1414, 1416) – Timan Heyntgen Dircxsz
- (1413, 1416, 1417) – Atienne van Empel
- (1413, 1415) – Sander Oosterom
- (1414) – Hillebrand Vechtersz
- (1414) – Claes Simon Kysersz
- (1415) – Jacob Jan Adamsz
- (1415) – Jonghen Willem Noort
- (1417) – Groote Pieter
- (1417) – IJsebrand de Wisselaer
- (1417–1418) – Willem Gartman
- (1418) – Franck Willem Jansz
- (1418–1419) – Jan Arentsz
- (1418) – Joost Pietersz
- (1419) – Servaes Roeloffz
- (1419) – Daem Braseman
- (1419) – Dirck Rollant
- (1419) – Willem Reynersz
- (1419, 1421–1422, 1425, 1431–1432) – Harman Harmansz
- (1419) – Heyn Willemszn Noirt
- (1420, 1422–1423) – Dirck Hollandt
- (1420–1421) – Jacob Duyvel
- (1420) – Pouwel Luytgensz
- (1420) – Jan Oude Brouck
- (1421) – Jan Woutersz
- (1421, 1424) – Claes Moyert
- (1422, 1424–1425, 1428–1429, 1432, 1435,1437) – Ruysch Jacob Coppensz
- (1422, 1425–1426, 1434, 1437–1438) – Anwel Pietersz
- (1423, 1428) – Moy Reynersz
- (1423, 1430) – Willem Dircxsz
- (1423–1424, 1426–1427, 1429–1430) – Jan Oettensz
- (1424, 1428, 1430–1431, 1434–1435, 1438–1439, 1442–1443) – Hugo Heynensz
- (1425) – Allert Pieter Allertsz
- (1426) – Dirck Bardeusz
- (1426) – Claes Jan Goertsz
- (1427) – Allert Jacob Bijlensz
- (1427) – Jan .. Allertsz
- (1427–1428) – Andries Drericsz
- (1429, 1432) – Groote Dirck Claesz
- (1429, 1435, 1441) – Jong Claes Symon Rijfersz
- (1430) – Symon Colijn
- (1431, 1434) – Claes Jansz
- (1431) – Jonghe Jacob de ..
- (1432–1433, 1435–1436, 1440–1441) – Jan Bout Albertsz
- (1433) – Jan Helmer
- (1433–1434, 1436, 1439–1440, 1442) – Gijsbert Jacob Grebbersz
- (1433, 1436, 1440, 1443, 1446) Jan Claes Symon Hoedincxz
- (1436–1437) – Clement Claesz
- (1437, 1439, 1441, 1442, 1445, 1448) – Pauwels Albertsz
- (1438) – Jan Heynenz
- (1438) – Jan Bedure
- (1439,1445) – Jacob Braseman
- (1440) – Jan Beth Willemsz
- (1441) – Ruysch Jacobsz
- (1442) – Allert Symonsz
- (1443) – Jacob Eybens
- (1443–1444) – Hendrik Anwelsz
- (1444) – Johannes Grebber
- (1444–1445) – Bellert Bechtersz
- (1444–1445, 1447) – Grebber Dircxz
- (1445) – Claes Tijoll
- (1445) – Ruysch Pietersz
- (1445) – Gerrit Groote Pietersz
- (1445–1446, 1452, 1454–1455, 1457, 1459–1460, 1462, 1464–1465, 1467) – Bartholomeus Doos
- (1446, 1448) – Jacob Eyhens
- (1446–1447) – Jan Deyman
- (1447, 1453–1454, 1457) – Dirck Boelensz (−1459)
- (1447–1448, 1452–1453, 1455, 1456) – Hendrik Dirckszn Stuyver (−1456)
- (1448–1449) – Melis Andriesz
- (1449) – Bartholomeus Pieter Reyniersz
- (1449–1450) – Hendrik Anwelsz
- (1449) – Roefrhe Jan Oetensz
- (1450) – Jacob Ropnersz
- (1450, 1464) – Gijsbert Claesz
- (1450, 1453) – Frederick IJsbrandtsz Baers
- (1451) – Jacob Reynersz
- (1451–1452) – Jacob Peekstock
- (1451, 1456) – Grebber Diricxz
- (1451) – Vechter Hillebrantsz
- (1452) – Hendrick Pouwel (−1452)
- (1452) – Jan Wouter Oetenz
- (1453) – Gijsen Jansz (uit Loosdrecht)
- (1454) – Pieter Claesz van Neck
- (1454, 1457–1458, 1462–1463, 1465–1466) – Jan Allertsz
- (1455) – Melis Schout Heynensz
- (1455, 1458–1459,1461) – Gerrit Dirck Smitsz
- (1456) – Copper Vechtersz
- (1456, 1459, 1464) – Jacob Pilien Allertsz
- (1456–1457) – Pieter Dirck Smitsz
- (1458, 1460,1463) – Pieter Allertsz Pietersz
- (1458) – Rombout Andriesz
- (1459, 1461–1462, 1465, 1468–1469, 1471–1472, 1474–1475, 1477, 1481–1482, 1486–1487) – Jacob Jacobsz de Jonge
- (1460) – Claes Melisz van Hoorn
- (1460–1461) – Coman Jan Tymansz
- (1461) – Heyman Ruysschenz
- (1462, 1465, 1468) – Gerrit Matheusz
- (1463, 1467) – Heyman van IJlp Pietersz
- (1463–1464, 1466–1467, 1476, 1478, 1480) – Gerret Dircksz Smit
- (1466, 1474, 1485) – Pieter Elertsz
- (1466, 1472) – Coman Andries Willemsz
- (1467–1468) – Gijsbert Dircxsz Muys
- (1468) – Jacob Ruysch
- (1469–1470, 1472–1473, 1475–1476, 1479–1480, 1482) – Pieter Roding Pietersz
- (1469) – Claes Stansen
- (1469) – Goossen Dirck Bardens
- (1470, 1472, 1475, 1478) – Boel Dirck Boelens (−1482)
- (1470–1471) – Jacob Hendrik Anvelsz
- (1470, 1474) – Louwerens Pouwelsz
- (1470, 1473, 1477–1478, 1480–1481, 1484, 1487) – Jan Beth Jansz
- (1470) – Wouter Oom
- (1473–1474) – Claes Stanssen
- (1473–1476, 1480, 1485, 1488, 1491) Jan Dircksz van Wormer
- (1475, 1479) – Symon Dircsz uit die Poorte
- (1476–1477) – Jan Talingh Jansz
- (1477) – Pieter Allert Pietersz
- (1478–1479) – Gerrit Deyman
- (1479, 1481, 1490–1491) – Jan Cleas van Hoppen
- (1481) – Jan Coman Jansz
- (1481) – Jacob Pieter Hillebrantsz (−1481)
- (1482, 1485–1486, 1488–1489, 1495) – Gijsbert Jacobsz Drooch
- (1482–1483, 1497) – Jacob van Breghe Pietersz
- (1483) – Pieter Haring Jansz
- (1483) – Egbert Jansz
- (1483–1484, 1489, 1502, 1505, 1507, 1509) – Dirck Heymansz Ruysch (−1509)
- (1484, 1491, 1494, 1499–1500) – Dirck Symon Bardenz
- (1484–1485, 1488, 1490, 1492, 1500, 1502) – Bartholomeus Jacobsz
- (1486, 1493) – Jacob van Berghe
- (1486) – Jan Claes Lambertsz
- (1487, 1493) – Jan Broeck Melijsz
- (1487–1488, 1490) – Gerrit Symon Claes Anwelfs
- (1489) – Vechter Barentsz
- (1489, 1490, 1492–1493) – Jacob Jong Jacobsz
- (1491–1492, 1495–1496, 1507) – Dirck Claesz
- (1492) – Jacob Willemszn van Beverwaarde
- (1493–1494, 1498–1499) – Dirck Heymansz
- (1494,1496) – Jan Bethz
- (1494–1495, 1497–1498, 1500–1502) – Willem Andriesz
- (1495, 1497) – Boel Jacobszn Bicker (−1505)
- (1496–1497, 1499, 1501–1502, 1504–1505, 1507–1510, 1512, 1514–1515, 1517) – Andries Boelens (1455–1519)
- (1496, 1498) – Willem Boem

== 16th century ==
- (1498) – Bruyninck Claesz
- (1499,1501, 1509, 1511, 1513, 1519) Clement Wolfertsz
- (1500, 1504, 1506, 1509, 1511, 1514) – Dirck Claesz Sillemoer
- (1496–1497, 1499, 1501–1502, 1504–1505, 1507–1510, 1512, 1514–1515, 1517) – Andries Boelens Dircksz. (1455–1519)
- (1502) – Jacob van Bergen Pietersz
- (1502–1503) – Jan Persijn Jansz
- (1503) – Jacob van Burgh
- (1503, 1510, 1512, 1515, 1519) – Corenelis Jansz de Vlaming (−1519)
- (1504, 1506, 1508–1509, 1511–1512, 1514, 1517–1518, 1520–1521, 1523–1524) – Claes Heyn Claesz (−1524)
- (1504, 1506, 1508) – Claes Moyert Dircxz
- (1505–1506, 1508–1509) – Gerrit Mattheusz (−1509)
- (1505, 1507, 1510–1511, 1513–1514, 1516–1517, 1519, 1522–1523, 1525–1526) – Floris Jan Claesz
- (1510, 1512–1513, 1515–1516, 1518, 1520, 1522, 1528, 1536–1537, 1539) – Claes Gerritsz Dayman
- (1513, 1515, 1518, 1523–1524, 1526, 1528–1529, 1531–1532, 1534–1535) – Ruysch Jan Beth
- (1516, 1521) – Willem Duyn Pietersz
- (1516, 1518–1519, 1521–1522, 1524, 1526) – Jonghen Dirck Claesz
- (1517, 1519, 1520) – Jan Lambert Jansz
- (1520) – Simon Claesz Sillemoer
- (1521, 1527, 1529–1530) – Hillebrant Jansz Otter
- (1520–1525, 1527–1528, 1530–1531, 1533–1534, 1537) – Albert Andries Boelensz
- (1523, 1525) – Robert Jacobsz
- (1524) – Symon Claesz van Doorn
- (1525, 1527) – Frans Claes Heynenszn
- (1526, 1527, 1529) – Lucas Jacobsz Persijn (−1530)
- (1528, 1530, 1532–1533, 1535) – Hayman Jacobs
- (1529, 1531, 1533) – Cornelis Hendriks Loen
- (1530, 1532, 1537–1538, 1540, 1541) Gerrit Andriesz
- (1531, 1533, 1535) – Peter Colijn (−10 May 1535)
- (1532, 1534, 1542) – Jacob Pietersz Haring
- (1534, 1536) – Cornelis Benning
- (1535–1536, 1538, 1541) – Jan Teng (−1541)
- (1535) – Goossen Jansz Reecalff
- (1536) – Cornelis Buyck Sybrantsz
- (1537, 1542) – Claes Hillebrantsz
- (1538–1539, 1541, 1543, 1545) – Claes Loen Fransz
- (1538, 1540–1541, 1543, 1546–1547, 1550–1551, 1554–1555, 1557, 1558) – Claes Gerrit Mattheusz (−1558)
- (1539–1540, 1542–1543, 1545–1546, 1548, 1549, 1551–1552, 1555–1556, 1564) – Hendrick Dircxs
- (1539, 1541–1542, 1544, 1546, 1548, 1553, 1558) – Claes Doedensz
- (1540, 1549, 1554) – Egbert Garbrantsz
- (1543–1544, 1547, 1549, 1551) – Cleas Heyn Willemsz
- (1544–1545, 1547–1548, 1550, 1552–1553, 1555, 1557, 1559–1560, 1562–1563, 1565) – Pieter Cantert Willemsz
- (1544, 1546, 1548, 1550, 1553) – Claes Hendriksz Basgen (1488–1563)
- (1545, 1547, 1551, 1556–1559, 1561, 1566, 1574) – Dirck Hillebrantsz Otter
- (1549–1550, 1552, 1554, 1556, 1559, 1561, 1565, 1567, 1569–1570, 1572, 1574–1577) – Joost Sijbrantsz Buyck (1505–1588)
- (1552, 1560, 1568) – Symon Mertensz
- (1553–1554, 1559) – Cornelis Dobbensz (−1559)
- (1555, 1557–1558) – Jan Duyvensz
- (1556, 1558, 1560, 1562–1563) – Sybrant Pompeius Occo
- (1559, 1561–1565, 1567–1568, 1570–1571, 1573–1574) – Symon Claes Copsz
- (1560–1561, 1564, 1566–1567, 1569, 1571–1572) – Jan Claes van Hoppen
- (1562–1563, 1566, 1571, 1573, 1575) Cornelis Jacobsz Brouwer
- (1565–1566, 1568, 1569, 1573) – Elbert Marcus
- (1567, 1571) – Hendrick Cornelisz
- (1568, 1570, 1572) – Floris Mertensz
- (1569) – Dirck Jan Dayman
- (1570, 1572, 1573) – Jacob Cornelisz
- (1574, 1576) – Pieter Pietersz
- (1575) – Cornelis Jacobsz van Leyden
- (1575–1576) – Jan Vechtersz
- (1576, 1578) – Jacob Theus Gerrijtsz
- (1577–1578) – Cornelis Claes Meusz
- (1577) – Jacob Cantert
- (1578) – Hendrik Jacobsz Bicker
- (1578) – Reyner Hendriksz
- (1578–1579, 1581–1582, 1584, 1586, 1589, 1592, 1594, 1597, 1601) MrWillem Bardensz=Wilhelm Baerdesen (1528–1601)
- (1578, 1580) – Maarten Jansz Koster (1520–1592)
- (1578, 1580) Adriaan Reiniersz Kromhout
- (1578) – Dirk Jansz. Graeff
- (1579) – Jan Claes Cat.
- (1579–1580, 1582–1583, 1585, 1587) – Egbert Roelofz
- (1579, 1581, 1583–1584, 1586–1587, 1592, 1597, 1602, 1604) – Cornelis Florisz van Teylingen
- (1580–1581, 1583, 1585–1586, 1588–1589, 1591–1592, 1594, 1595) – Reynier Cant(1536–1595)
- (1581) – Reynier van Neck
- (1582, 1584–1585) MrMarten Jansz Coster
- (1582, 1587, 1589, 1593, 1596, 1599, 1600) – Jan Claes in Hamburch
- (1583, 1585, 1587–1588, 1590–1591, 1593–1594, 1597–1598, 1600, 1602–1603, 1605–1606, 1608) – Pieter Cornelisz Boom
- (1584) – Jan Verburch
- (1586, 1588, 1590, 1592) – Claes Fransz Oetgens
- (1588, 1591, 1594, 1596–1597, 1601–1602, 1604–1605, 1607–1608, 1610) – Cornelis Pieters Hooft (1547–1626)
- (1589–1590, 1593) – Cornelis Florisz
- (1590, 1593, 1595, 1599–1600) – Balthazar Appelman
- (1591, 1595–1596, 1600–1601, 1603, 1605, 1613–1614, 1616, 1618, 1621, 1623) – Barthold Adriaensz Cromhout
- (1595, 1598–1599, 1606–1607, 1609–1610, 1612, 1614) – Jacob Andriesz Boelens
- (1596, 1598, 1601, 1603–1604, 1606) Jan de Dzn Egbertsz
- (1598, 1599, 1604, 1607, 1611–1612) Frans Hendricxsz Oetgens

== 17th century ==
- (1601, 1607, 1610, 1611, 1613) – Cornelis Benning
- (1602, 1608–1609) – Claes Fransz
- (1603) – Gerrit Pietersz Bicker (1554–1604)
- (1606, 1608) – Sebastiaen Egberts (1563-)
- (1610) – Dirck Bas (1569–1637)
- (1605, 1609, 1611, 1614, 1616, 1617, 1619 and 1620) – Reynier Pauw
- (1611, 1614) – Roelof Egbertsz
- (1612) – Jan Pietersz Reael
- (1609, 1612–1613 Gerrit Jacobsz Witsen
- (1613–1637) – Jacob de Graeff Dircksz. (1570–1638)
- (???? – ????) – Jacob Poppen (1576–1624)
- (1626–1647) – Jan Cornelisz. Geelvinck (1579–1651)
- (1627–1633) – Geurt van Beuningen
- (???? – ????) – Jan Six (1618–1700)
- (???? – ????) – Hendrik Trip
- (???? – ????) – Hendrik Hooft
- (1627–1649) – Andries Bicker (1586–1652)
- (1638–1646) – Albert C. Burgh (1593–1647)
- (1639–1649) – Gerbrand Claesz Pancras (1591–1649)
- (1650 – ????) – Frans Banning Cocq
- (1646–1650, 1654) – Cornelis Bicker (1593–1654)
- (1653) – Jan Bicker (1591–1653)
- (1653–1654) – Cornelis Jan Witsen (1605–1669)
- (1654 – ????) – Nicolaes Tulp (1593–1674)
- (1643–1664) – Cornelis de Graeff (1599–1664)
- (???? – ????) – Willem Cornelisz Bakker (1595–1652)
- (???? – ????) – Gerard Schaep (1598–1666)
- (???? – ????) – Gerrit Dedel
- (1657–1671) – Andries de Graeff (1611–1678)
- (???? – ????) – Joan Huydecoper I (1599–1661)
- (???? – ????) – Joan Huydecoper II (1625–1704)
- (???? – ????) – David de Wildt
- (1665, 1666, 1668, 1670, 1673, 1674, 1676, 1678, 1679) – Gillis Valckenier (1666–1727)
- (1667, 1668, 1672) – Lambert Reynst (1613–1679)
- (1669–1686) – Coenraad van Beuningen (1622–1693)
- (1673–1689) – Cornelis Geelvinck (1621–1689)

== 18th century ==
- (1672–1704) – Joannes Hudde (1628–1704)
- (1682–1705) – Nicolaas Witsen (1641–1717)
- (1695) – Jacob Jacobsz Hinlopen
- (1695) – Jan Corver
- (1695) – Nicolaas Opmeer
- (1696) – Jacob Boreel
- (1697 – ????) – François de Vicq (1646–1707)
- (1702) – Dirk Bas
- (1702) – Gerbrand Pancras
- (1708, 1711, 1714, 1716–1717) – Gerrit Hooft (1649–1717)
- (1718, 1730) – Jan van de Poll(1) (1666–1735)
- (???? – ????) – Jan van de Poll(2) (1597–1678)
- (???? – ????) – Jan van de Poll(3) (1668–1745)
- (???? – ????) – Egidius van den Bempden (1667–1737)
- (???? – ????) – Hendrikus Bicker (1682–1738)
- (???? – ????) – Cornelis Hop (1685–1762)
- (???? – ????) – Willem Munter (1682–1759)
- (1720, 1743) – Lieve Geelvinck (1676–1743)
- Nicolaes Sautijn(−1743)
- (1748) – Nicolaes Geelvinck
- (1722–1736) – Mattheus Lestevenon (1674–1743)
- (1737, 1740, 1743) – Gerrit Hooft II (1684–1767)
- (1740) – Gerrit Corver
- (???? – 1748) – Gillis van den Bempden
- (1745) – Harmen Hendrik van de Poll (1697–1772)
- (???? – ????) – Pieter Rendorp (1703–1760)
- (1753, 1756, 1759, 1762) – Cornelis Hop (1685–1762)
- (???? – ????) – Quirijn Willem van Hoorn (1730–1797)
- (???? – 1787) – Hendrik Daniëlsz Hooft (1716–1794)
- (???? – ????) – Jacob Elias Arnoudsz (1728–1800)
- (1781–1792) – Joachim Rendorp (1728–1792)
- (???? – 1787, 1793) Frederick Alewijn
- (1793) – Nicolaas Faas
- (1793) – Jacob Elias Arnoudsz (1728–1800)
- (1793) – Willem Gerrit Dedel Salomonsz (1734–?)

== 19th century ==
- 1811–1813: Willem Joseph van Brienen van de Groote Lindt (1760–1839)
- 1813–1824: Pieter Alexander van Boetzelaer (1759–1826)
- 1813–1824: Jan Brouwer Joachimsz
- 1813–1816: Paul Ivan Hogguer (1760–1816)
- 1813–1824: David Willem Elias (1758–1828)
- 1816–1824: Gerrit Blaauw
- 1821–1824: Adries Adolph Deutz van Assendelft (1764–1833)
- 1824–1828: David Willem Elias (1758–1828)
- 1828–1836: Frederik van de Poll (1780–1853)
- 1836–1842: Willem Daniël Cramer (1788–1856)
- 1842–1849: Pieter Huidekoper (1798–1852)
- 1850–1853: Gerlach Cornelis Joannes van Reenen (1818–1893)
- 1853–1853: Hendrik Provó Kluit (1803–1860)
- 1854: no mayor
- 1855–1858: Cornelis Hendrik Boudewijn Boot (1813–1892)
- 1858–1866: Jan Messchert van Vollenhoven (1812–1881)
- 1866–1868: Cornelis Fock (1828–1910)
- 1868–1880: Cornelis den Tex (1824–1882)
- 1880–1891: Gijsbert van Tienhoven (1841–1914)
- 1891–1901: Sjoerd Anne Vening Meinesz (1833–1909)

== Early 20th century ==
- 1901–1910: Wilhelmus Frederik van Leeuwen (1860–1930)
- 1910–1915: Antonie baron Roëll (1864–1940)
- 1915–1921: Jan Willem Cornelis Tellegen (1859–1921)
- 1921–1941: Willem de Vlugt (1872–1945)
- 1941–1945: Edward John Voûte (1887–1950)
- 1945–1946: Feike de Boer (1892–1976)
- 1946–1957: Arnold Jan d'Ailly (1902–1967)

== List of mayors of Amsterdam since 1957 ==
Mayor		Term of office			Party
Mayor		Took office	Left office	Length	Party
Gijs van Hall	Gijs van Hall (1904–1977)	1 February 1957	1 July 1967	10 years, 150 days^{[Dis]}	Labour Party
P. J. Koets	P. J. Koets (1901–1995)	1 July 1967	1 August 1967	31 days)^{[Ad Interim]}	Labour Party
Ivo Samkalden	Dr. Ivo Samkalden (1912–1995)	1 August 1967	1 June 1977	9 years, 304 days	Labour Party
Louis Kuijpers	Louis Kuijpers (1920–2000)	1 June 1977	15 June 1977	14 days)^{[Ad Interim]}	Labour Party
Wim Polak	Wim Polak (1924–1999)	15 June 1977	1 June 1983	5 years, 351 days	Labour Party
Enneüs Heerma	Enneüs Heerma (1944–1999)	1 June 1983	16 June 1983	15 days^{[Ad Interim]}	Christian Democratic Appeal
Ed van Thijn	Ed van Thijn (1934–2021)	16 June 1983	18 January 1994	10 years, 216 days^{[Res]}	Labour Party
Frank de Grave	Frank de Grave (born 1955)	18 January 1994	1 June 1994	134 days^{[Ad Interim]}	People's Party for Freedom and Democracy
Schelto Patijn	Dr. Schelto Patijn (1936–2007)	1 June 1994	1 January 2001	6 years, 214 days	Labour Party
Guusje ter Horst	Dr. Guusje ter Horst (born 1952)	1 January 2001	15 January 2001	14 days^{[Ad Interim]}	Labour Party
Job Cohen	Dr. Job Cohen (born 1947)	15 January 2001	12 March 2010	9 years, 56 days^{[Res]}	Labour Party
Lodewijk Asscher	Dr. Lodewijk Asscher (born 1974)	12 March 2010	7 July 2010	117 days^{[Ad Interim]}	Labour Party
Eberhard van der Laan	Eberhard van der Laan (1955–2017)	7 July 2010	5 October 2017	7 years, 90 days^{[Died]}	Labour Party
Kajsa Ollongren	Jonkvrouw; Kajsa Ollongren (born 1967)	5 October 2017	26 October 2017	21 days^{[Ad Interim]} ^{[Res]}	Democrats 66
Eric van der Burg	Eric van der Burg (born 1965)	26 October 2017	4 December 2017	39 days^{[Ad Interim]}	People's Party for Freedom and Democracy
Jozias van Aartsen	Jozias van Aartsen (born 1947)	4 December 2017	12 July 2018	220 days^{[Acting]}	People's Party for Freedom and Democracy
Femke Halsema	Femke Halsema (born 1966)	12 July 2018	Incumbent	8 years, 57 days	GreenLeft

^{Resigned}
^{Acting}
^{Ad Interim}
^{Dismissed from office}
^{Died in Office}
^{Resigned after appointed Minister of the Interior}

== See also ==
- Namen van de regeerders der stad Amsterdam, Volume 1
- Government of Amsterdam
