= Dutch East Company =

Dutch Nazi organization

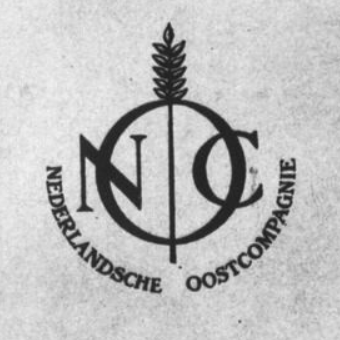
- Native name: Nederlandsche Oost Compagnie
- Company type: Joint-stock company
- Founded: 6 June 1942; 84 years ago
- Founder: Meinoud Rost van Tonningen
- Defunct: 1944
- Fate: Dissolved by the Allies of World War II
- Headquarters: Netherlands, The Hague
- Area served: Eastern Europe; Baltics
- Key people: Daniël Krantz, Pieter Schelte Heerema, F.B.J. Gips, F.L. Rambonnet, Jan Robertson, Prof. Dijt, Willem Goedhuys

The Dutch East Company (Nederlandsche Oost Compagnie [ˈneːdərlɑntsə oːst kɔmpɑˈɲi]; abbr. NOC [ˌɛnoːˈseː]) was a National Socialist organization established during the Second World War, on 6 June 1942, in The Hague by the Dutch National Socialist Movement (abbr. NSB) under Meinoud Rost van Tonningen, with the involvement of De Nederlandsche Bank. The NOC was a joint-stock company.

== Goals ==
With the help of the NOC, Rost van Tonningen aimed to establish Dutch colonies in the territories conquered by the Nazis, particularly in Ukraine, Estonia, Latvia, and Lithuania. Furthermore, the organization saw itself as a continuation of the tradition of the Dutch East India Company (Vereenigde Oostindische Compagnie, abbr. VOC). In doing so, Rost van Tonningen also aligned with the Nazis' concept of Lebensraum ("living space"). The eastward colonization was to be coordinated by colonial trading companies. These companies had been cut off from their former trading area in the Dutch East Indies due to the war and had experience with colonial methods. Another goal of the NOC was the "Aryanization" of Eastern Europe.

== Places ==
The organization was headquartered in The Hague. The main office was located at Amaliastraat 1–3, and the insurance department at Anna Paulownastraat 35. Another address that was used was Parkstraat 22. The NOC had branches in Berlin, Kovno (Kaunas), Vilna (Vilnius), Riga, Dorpat (Tartu), Rovno (Rivne), Kiev (Kyiv), and Minsk.

The Dutch East Institute (Nederlandse Oost Instituut, abbr. NOI), headed by Willem Goedhuys, initially served as the statistics and research department of the NOC, and later primarily as its propaganda and information outlet.

In Ukrainian SSR, the NOC managed several state-owned farms (former sovkhozes), including the state farm Uzin (Uzyn) in the Skvira (Skvyra) district, General District Kiev, with an area of 2,600 hectares, which was taken over by three Dutch senior administrators in April 1943, and a group of six other state farms in Skvira, covering a total of around 6,000 hectares, administered by one Dutch senior administrator and three Dutch assistants (a livestock breeder, a gardener, and an accountant). Both holdings had to be abandoned as early as September 1943 due to the advance of the Red Army.

Dutch dairy experts, especially in cheese production, were deployed in Melitopol and in the regions of Kamenets-Podolsk and Zhytomir. Dutch workers were also employed at the cotton research station in Kherson.

The NOC operated its own training center for Dutch colonists in what was known as the Ostland, located in Rogachev, Byelorussian SSR. The director of this agricultural school run by the NOC was the Dutch farmer Arnout de Waard. Training in Rogachev was provided by German specialists from the Land Management Company Ukraine (abbr. LBGU). About 30 Dutch eastern colonists received a two- to three-week training course there. Afterward, most of them were initially assigned as assistants to a German base supervisor from the LBGU before becoming base supervisors themselves. They were issued dark green uniforms and received basic training in the use of pistols and carbines. German language instruction was also part of the curriculum.

The NOC managed the "Waka T" estate, about 30 kilometers south of Vilnius in the Lithuanian SSR. There, the NOC also operated an agricultural school. About 25 kilometers east of "Waka T", in Lentvaris, not far from Trakai, the NOC leased another estate from the German Land Management Company Ostland (abbr. LBGO). In the Biała Waka ("White Wacke") marsh, Dutch workers from the NOC extracted peat. Near the Latvian village of Mālpils, the NOC operated another agricultural and horticultural school as well as a vegetable cultivation site.

From November 1941, a large number of Dutch specialists aged 17 to 60, most of whom belonged to Anton Adriaan Mussert's NSB, were prepared at a resettlement camp in Łódź for their deployment as managers of abandoned farms in the Russian territories occupied by the Wehrmacht. From March 1942, they prepared the spring planting on the confiscated farms.

== History ==
An earlier German organization, the East German Land Management Company, was already engaged in exploiting the conquered territories to finance the German war economy. There was also the Werkdienst Holland, whose workers in the East labored under terrible conditions. In addition, there was the commission for the deployment of farmers to Eastern Europe (Commissie tot uitzending van landbouwers naar Oost-Europa, abbr. CULANO), whose chairman, the later Dutch Minister of Agriculture, Defense, and Colonies Cornelis "Kees" Staff, resigned upon the founding of the NOC. As early as July 1941, the first 600 Dutch farmers moved east, even before the NOC was founded in spring 1942. Thousands of Dutch people worked in Ukraine as farmers, construction workers, peat cutters, or dredgers, sometimes through organizations other than the NOC. Among them were 80 women. Many of the Dutch workers had an NSB background or were pro-German, but forced laborers were also sent to work as so called "SS Frontier Workers." The NOC's success was limited because Rost van Tonningen's initiative was not widely welcomed. For example, the Nazis tolerated the NOC only because they expected to benefit from it. Another reason for the organization's limited success was the slow flow of goods from the Netherlands to the Nazi-occupied territories. The NOC was also hindered by the Germans in obtaining the necessary export licenses. According to the historian Loe de Jong, there was a lack of order at the NOC headquarters. As a result, many private investors gave up.

At the height of its activity, the NOC, including the organizations it took over in 1942/43, such as the "Werkdienst Holland" and the Dutch "SS Frontier Workers", was responsible for at least 7,000 Dutch workers. Most of them were deployed in the Reichskommissariat Ukraine, many working for the Land Management Company Ukraine (LBGU).

In the autumn of 1943, the Germans withdrew from Ukrainian SSR, and the focus of the NOC shifted to the Baltic states. When these areas were also recaptured by the Red Army during 1944, the Dutch emigrants were forced to flee to Germany.

== Management ==
Rost van Tonningen was appointed president of the NOC by the Reich Commissioner for the German-occupied Netherlands, Arthur Seyss-Inquart. He was also chairman of the supervisory board. The managing director was the banker and NSB member Daniël Krantz. Pieter Schelte Heerema served as co-director of the NOC for a time. F.B.J. Gips became president of the board of trustees, and F.L. Rambonnet was the general treasurer. Present at the founding of the NOC were Jan Robertson (representing Rost van Tonningen), councilor Johannes Walch (representing the mayor of Amsterdam, Edward John Voûte), and councilor Gerrit Coenraad Blom (on behalf of the mayor of Rotterdam, Frederik Ernst Müller).

The head of the agricultural department of the N.O.C. was Prof. Dijt. The chief department head of the NOC was Willem Goedhuys. Department head T. van der Zee from the Dutch Ministry of Finance was delegated to the NOC.

The Dutch farmer and NSB supporter Jan Barendregt acted as a liaison between the Nederlandsche Oost Compagnie and the German Reich Ministry for the Occupied Eastern Territories (Ostministerium) until he was killed in an air raid on Berlin in February 1944.

== Financing ==
The organization was financed by De Nederlandsche Bank (whose president was Rost van Tonningen) and the Dutch state, but the municipalities of Amsterdam and Rotterdam also contributed to funding the NOC.

== Subsidiaries ==
An NOC subsidiary was the "Dutch East Construction Company" (Nederlandsche Oostbouw, abbr. NOB), founded on 11 January 1943, a contracting firm initially led by Pieter Schelte Heerema. The majority of workers sent east worked for the NOB. Volunteers mostly worked for companies under the NOB's management, while forced laborers from the Ministry of Labor often worked directly for the NOB. Other subsidiaries included the "Dutch East Fisheries" (Nederlandsche Oostvisscherij), which sent Dutch fishermen to Lake Peipus to supply fish for the German Wehrmacht, the "Dutch East Dredging Company" (Nederlandsche Oostbagger), which carried out dredging work for the Organisation Todt with leased equipment on the Dnieper River between Kiev and Dnepropetrovsk, the "Dutch East Brick Company" (Nederlandsche Oostbaksteen), the "Dutch East Shipping Company" (Nederlandsche Oostrederij), and the "Dutch East Trading Company" (Nederlandsche Oost Handel Maatschappij).

== End of operation ==
With the advance of the Red Army, the NOC came under pressure. The Dutch farmers fled from areas threatened by the Red Army and attempted to resettle elsewhere. After the German Wehrmacht and German authorities began to withdraw from Ukrainian SSR in the fall of 1943 due to the advancing Red Army, the focus of the NOC's activities shifted first to the Baltic states, which at the time were part of the Reichskommissariat Ostland. However, when the Red Army also recaptured these areas over the course of 1944, the Reich Ministry for the Occupied Eastern Territories (RMfdbO) terminated the employment of all Dutch personnel in the Land Management Company Ostland at the end of August 1944. In the following weeks, there were intense bureaucratic disputes between the NOC and German authorities over where the Dutch farmers, gardeners, workers, and specialists should now be deployed, whether in East Prussia, the "Warthegau", Pomerania, the Kurmark (Oderbruch), or further inside Germany. In early October 1944, the Red Army encircled the German troops stationed in the Baltics (Army Group North). Several dozen Dutch farmers and other NOC personnel remained behind in the so-called "Courland Pocket", and their fate remains unknown.

On 28 December 1944, Rost van Tonningen was dismissed by Anton Mussert, the leader of the Dutch National Socialist NSB party. After the liberation of the Netherlands by the Allies, the NOC was dissolved. Legal proceedings were initiated against several of its key personnel, but not initially against Heerema. It was only in 1981 that prosecution of Heerema was considered, as it had been his idea to use forced labor for the NOC, but he died before charges could be brought.

== Literature ==
- Loe de Jong used the NOC archive while preparing his books, including correspondence from Rost van Tonningen.
- In 2004, the NIOD researcher David Barnouw wrote the book "Oostboeren, zee-germanen und Torfschneider" based on the existing NOC archive.
- Joh. Roos (Leiden University) wrote a master's thesis on the NOC, titled "De Cost ging für den Baet ... Why the Nederlandsche Oost Compagnie NV Continued Voluntary Operations in the Dutch East Until the End of the War, 1942–1945."
- Victor Flietstra (Utrecht University): "Aarnout de Waard, Occupier or Farmer? The Experiences of an Agricultural Director in Rogachev."
