= Dirck Jansz Graeff =

Dutch politician

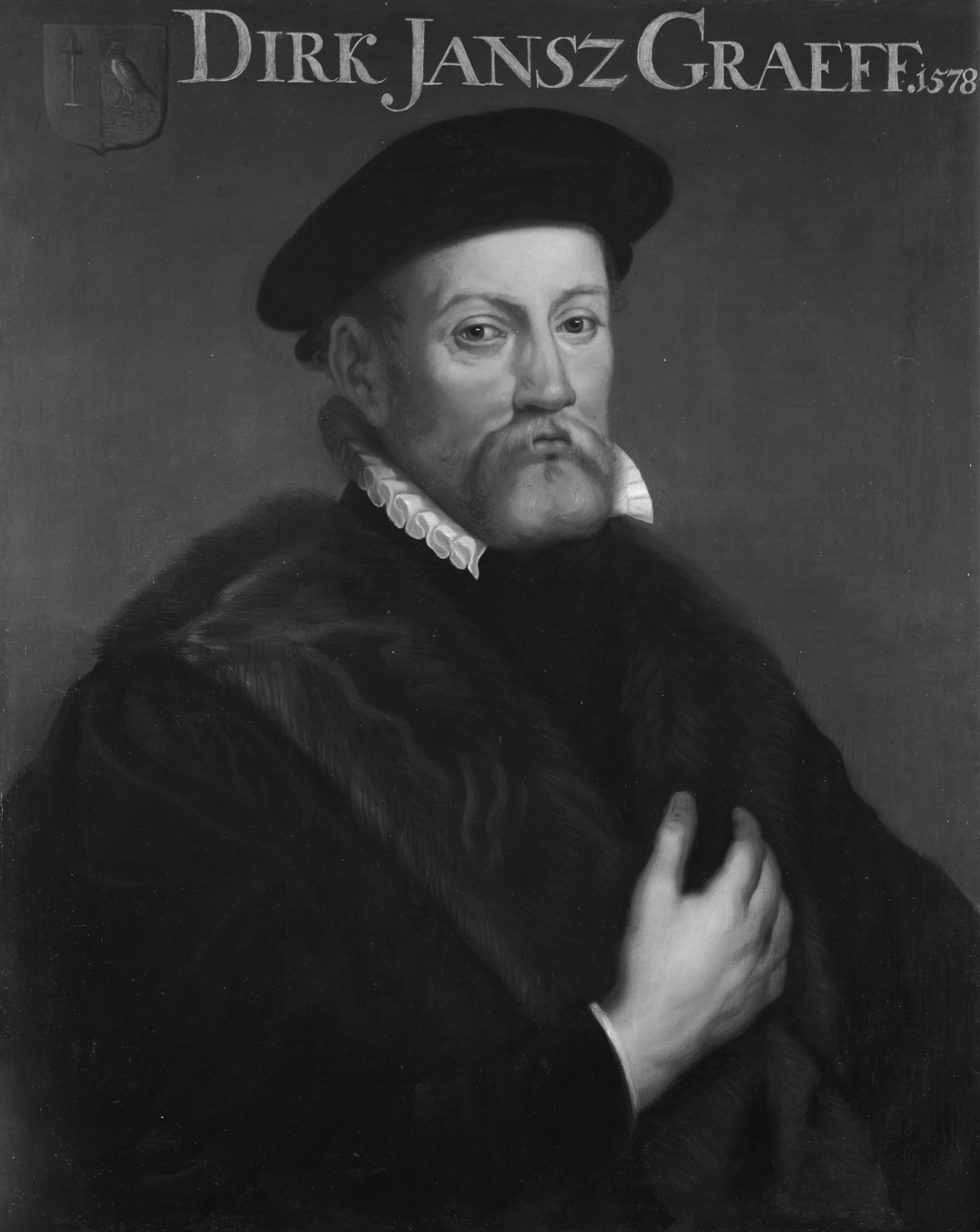

Regent and Mayor of Amsterdam
- In office 1578–1579

Personal details
- Born: 1532 Amsterdam
- Died: 27 July 1589 (aged 56–57) Amsterdam
- Party: States Faction
- Spouse(s): 1) Agnies Pietresdr van Neck; 2) Jan Claes Cat
- Relations: Admiral Jacob Cornelisz van Neck (distant cousin via Agnies Pietersdr van Neck)
- Children: Weyntje, Jan (or Johan), Jacob, Pieter, Cornelis
- Occupation: burgomaster
- Profession: Wholesaler and ship-owner

Dirck Jansz Graeff, also Diederik Jansz Graeff, Lord of the manors Valckeveen and Vredenhof (Amsterdam 1532 – 27 July 1589), was a patrician, wholesaler, shipowner, politician and large landowner. He became an important figure of the Protestant Reformation, member of the Reformed Church, supporter of the Geuzen and the Protestant-minded community of wholesale merchants, and a confidant of William I of Orange (William the Silent). Graeff was the founder of a regent dynasty of the Dutch Golden Age and the short time of the First Stadtholderless Period that retained power and influence for centuries and produced a number of ministers. He was the first Burgomaster of Amsterdam from the De Graeff family.

== Family De Graeff ==
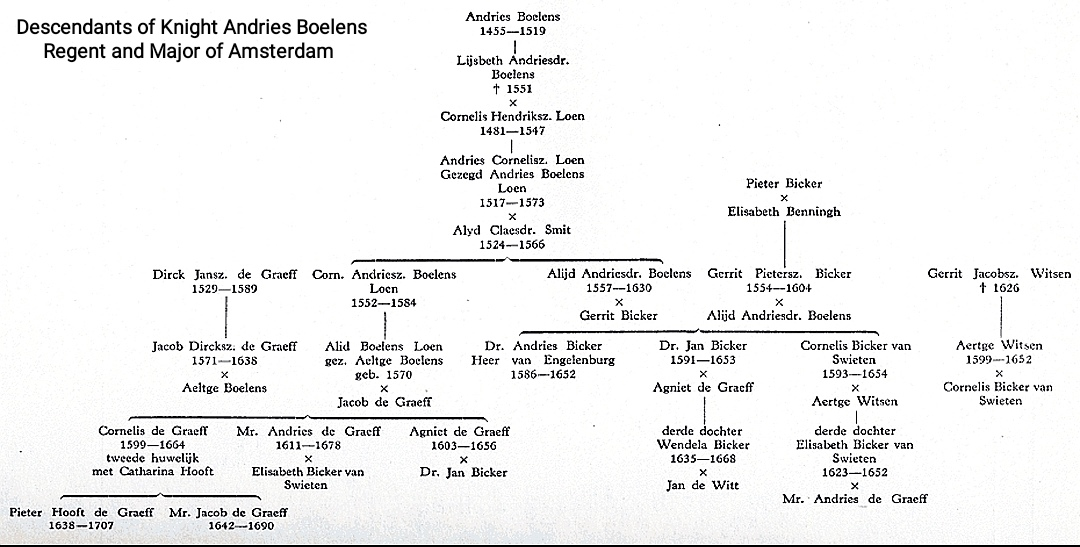
Overview of the personal family relationships of the Amsterdam oligarchy between the regent-dynasties Boelens Loen, De Graeff, Bicker (van Swieten), Witsen and Johan de Witt in the Dutch Golden Age

Dirck Jansz Graeffs was the first illustrious member of the De Graeff family. His parents were Jan Pietersz Graeff, a cloth wholesaler and advisor of Amsterdam, and Stein Braseman. His older brother was Lenaert Jansz de Graeff, an important figure of the Protestant Reformation in Amsterdam and privateer and leading captain of the Sea Beggars in the Capture of Brielle.

During the Dutch Golden Age, the De Graeff family were very critical of the Orange family's influence in the Netherlands. Together with the Republican-minded family Bicker, the De Graeffs strived for the abolition of stadtholdership. They desired the full sovereignty of the individual regions in which the Republic of the United Seven Netherlands were not ruled by a single person. Instead of a sovereign (or stadtholder) the political and military power was lodged with the States General and with the regents of the cities in Holland.

=== Coat of arms ===
The coat of arms of Dirck Jansz Graeff is divided and shows the following symbols:

- field I (left above) shows the silver shovel on red of their paternal ancestors, the Herren von Graben
- field II (right above) shows the silver swan on blue (Waterland) of their maternal ancestors, the De Grebber.

After he has bought the estate Valckeveen (Valkenburg) in Gooiland his coat of arms shows in field II a white falcon on silver instead of the swan.

- helmet covers in red and silver
- helm adornment shows an upright silver spade with ostrich feathers (Herren von Graben)
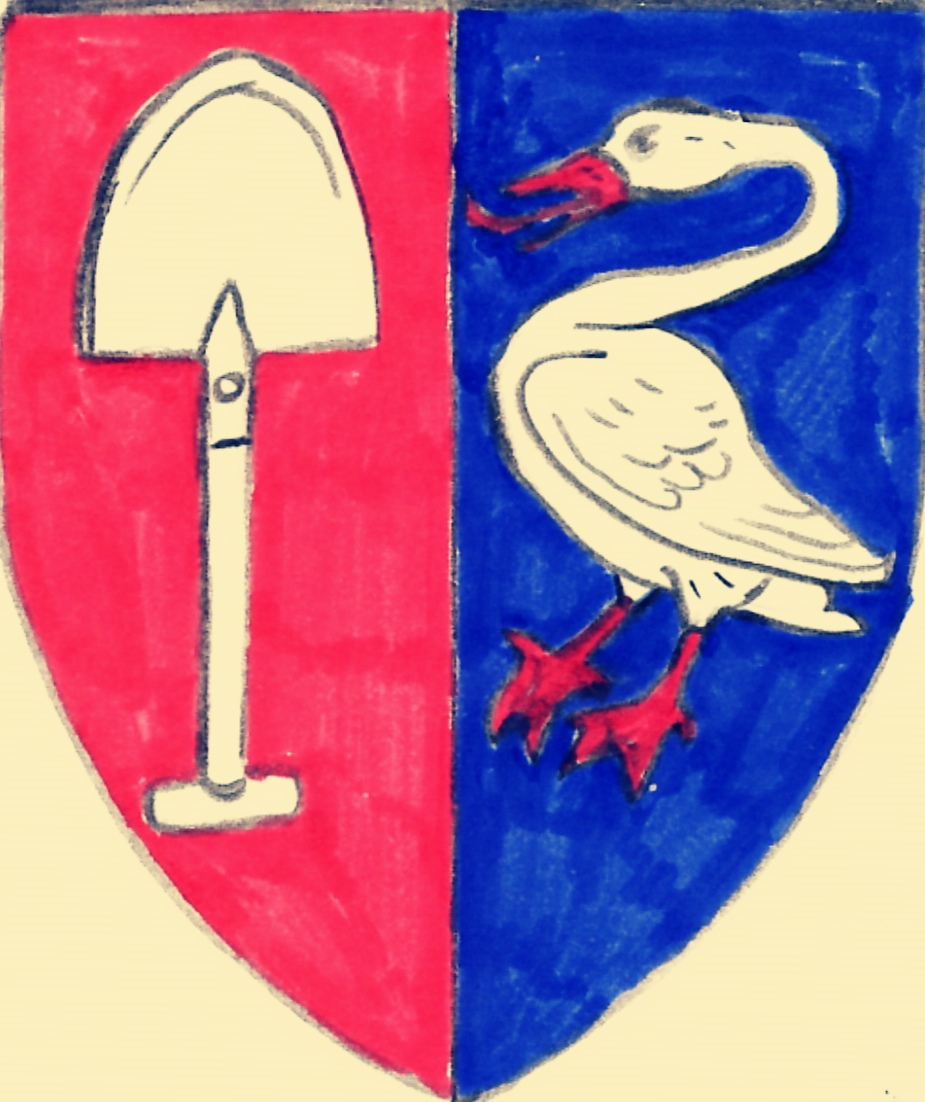
Coat of arms Graeff (ancient). The family coat of arms with the silver spade on a red (Von Graben) and silver swan on a blue background (De Grebber) was first documented in 1543 by Jan Pietersz Graeff.

Coat of arms as Lord of the manor of Valckeveen (Valkenburg)

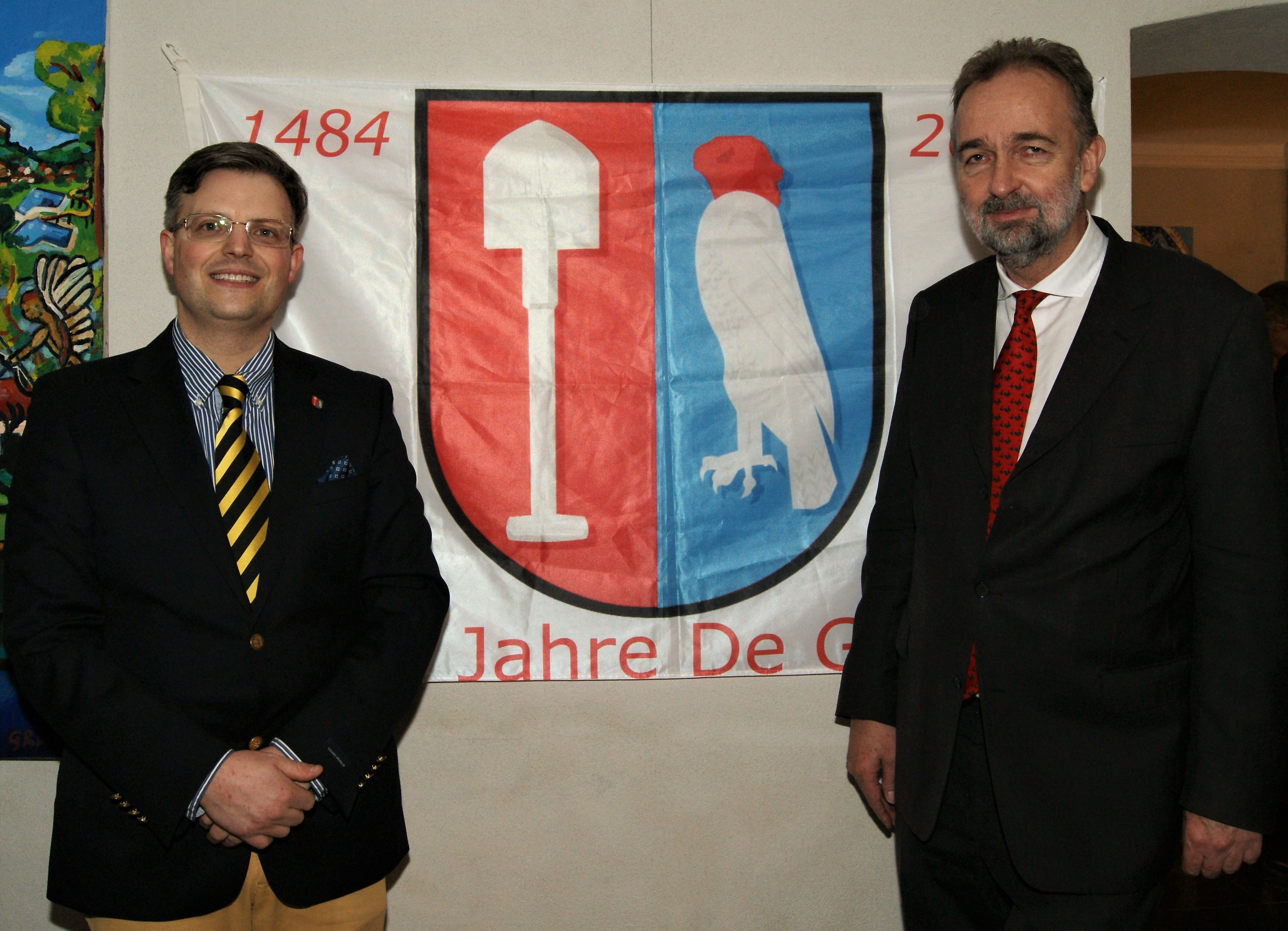
HIH Archduke Karl of Austria (Karl von Habsburg), head of the House Habsburg-Lorraine, the former imperial and royal house of the Holy Roman Empire and Austria (right) and Matthias Laurenz Gräff (left)

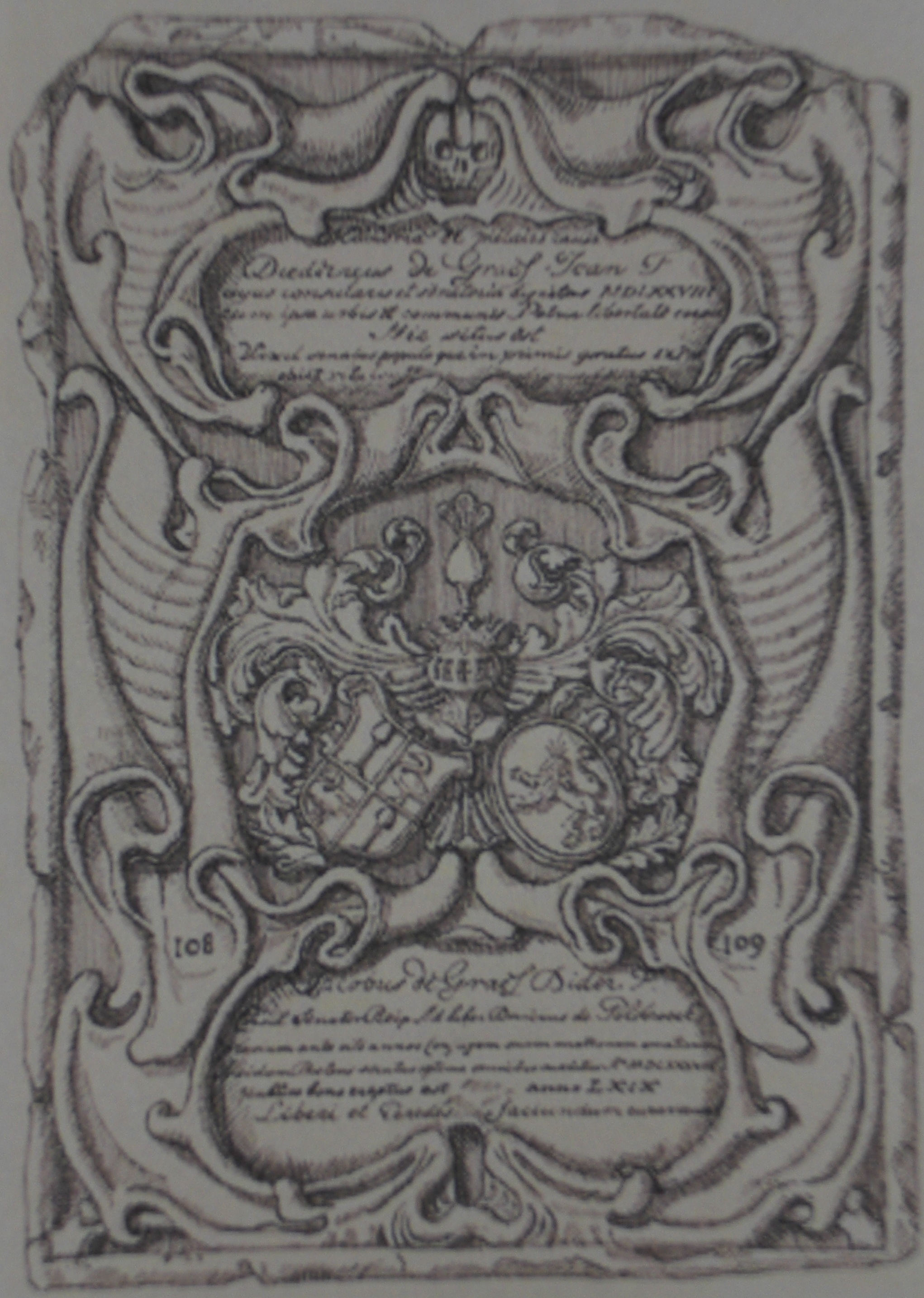
Epitaph and coat of arms at the Oude kerk (Amsterdam)

=== Marriage and children ===
Dirck was first married to Agnies Pietresdr van Neck, daughter of Pieter van Neck. They had the following children:

- Weyntje Dircksz (de) Graeff - married to Jacob Andriesz Boelens
- Jan Dircksz Graeff (1560–1630) lived at his Landhouse Vredenhof near Voorschoten, died in Loosdrecht, New Hampshire.
- Jacob Dircksz de Graeff (1570–1638) - Regent of Amsterdam, Lord of the semisouveain Lordship Zuid-Polsbroek etc.
- Pieter Dircksz Graeff (1573–1645) - since 1620 Lord of Engelenburg, near Brummen and advisor of the city of Amsterdam. Pieter drives in 1613 to Palestina and visited the Holy Grave in Jerusalem. He lives at the Fluweelenburgwal at Amsterdam.
- Cornelis Dircksz Graeff, alias van Rijn - schepen van Dorp; married with N. N. Vercroft (van Crocht), daughter of Jan Claesz Vercroft (van) Crocht (around 1510–1571), schepen and builder in the Duifpolder of Maasland; they had a son, Jan Cornelisz (De) Graef(f), married to Neeltgen Cornelisdr; the couple had daughter Neeltgen Jans Vercroft (not Graeff)

Afterwards he married Teuwt Jansdr Cat, daughter of Jan Claesz Cat, burgomaster of Amsterdam. The couple had no progeny.

== Life and work ==
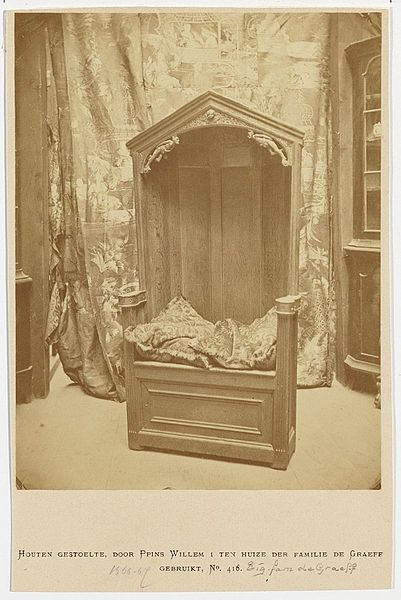
The armchair on which William I of Orange, "the Silent" sat when visiting Dirck Jansz Graeff at his house in 1567/1568 (?) and 1580

Dirck Jansz Graeff was a merchant, he bought and sold steel at his house De Keyser in a street, now called Damrak. Like his brothers Jan, Lenaert and Jacob, Dirck was one of the richest inhabitants of Amsterdam. In 1564 he was a member of a delegation who spoke with the Spanish Regent Margaret of Parma about the political situation in Amsterdam and the province Holland. In 1567 he was against Charles de Brimeus entry in Amsterdam. In March of that year, backed by the brothers De Graeff and a large part of the bourgeoisie Henry, Count of Bréderode became the Generalcaptain of the city.

In 1566, the Protestant-minded community of patrician and wholesale merchants around Graeff, Jan Jacobsz Bal Huydecoper van Wieringen, Jacobsz Reael, Adriaan Pauw and Cornelis Hooft took over the social leadership within the city of Amsterdam in order to hold it in a political sense after the Alteratie of Amsterdam in 1578. Graeff continued to enjoy the friendship of William I of Orange, known as William the Silent, whose political motives and goals regarding detachment from Spain and religious freedom he also enjoyed. When the prince paid him a visit in his Amsterdam town house “De Keyser” in the crisis year of 1567, the two discussed the issues of the city and the country. The armchair which was used by Prince William at another visit at Graeffs house was now part of the collection of the Rijksmuseum Amsterdam. This hooded chair is a unique example of an item of formal furniture from the estate of a late 16th-century Amsterdam burgomaster. Attached to the back of this armchair is a copper plate with the words from Pieter de Graeff "Willem the First, Prince of Orange, set in this chair in 1568 when he stayed with my great-grandfather, Burgomaster Dirk Jansz de Graeff, who then lived in a house called De Keijser by the water."

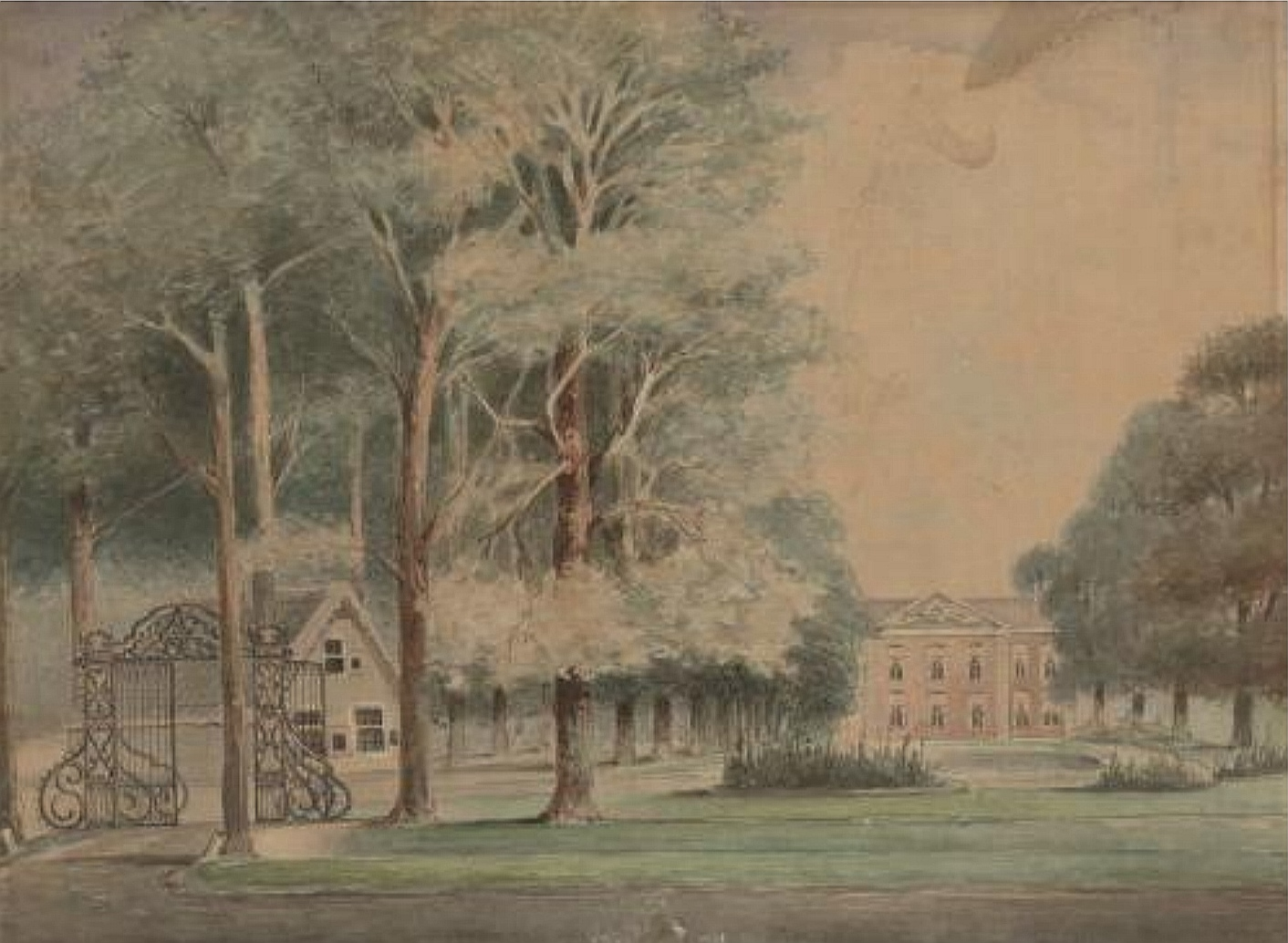
Country estate Vredenhof

In Graeff's house, treaties between the leading Catholics and the Geuzen were also made at this. In 1568 the four burgomasters of Amsterdam and the representatives of the religious groups signed a contract there too. In 1568 Graeff belonged to the leading Reformed people. However, since Graeff also conducted many other political consultations, the danger from the Spanish was increasing for him. But it took a long time before he could decide to leave his hometown. In 1572 he had to led to Emden at the arrival of the Duke of Alba. In 1576 he came to Utrecht, and worked together with Pieter Pietersz Bicker as a delegate of the Dutch States-General in Hamburg and Bremen, where they were able to take out a loan of 600,000 guilders for the Dutch government. He then spent some time in Hoorn, only to return to his hometown in 1578 - after the "Alteratie van Amsterdam". In the same year, Graeff was appointed Amsterdam's first new burgomaster, also at the request of his friend William of Orange. He also was made councillor of the city, a position which he held until his death in 1589. In the same year, Graeff once again hosted Wilhelm von Orange in his house "De Keyser".

Dirck Jansz Graeff was also a wealthy shipowner who was involved in running over 100 merchant ships, using which he traded mainly with Portugal. In the years 1584/1585 he was the richest resident of Amsterdam with a fortune of 140,000 guilders. He invested his fortune in buying a large country estate called Vredenhof near Voorschoten. He also owned an estate in Gooiland which he named Valkeveen (later the Valckenburg estate) in honor of his Together with Jan Jacobsz Bal Huydecoper van Wieringen, Frans Hendricksz Oetgens van Waveren and Hendrick Hudde, Graeff was considered the largest landowner among the Amsterdam patriciate.

Dircks tomb chapel is located in the Oude Kerk at Amsterdam.

== Trivia ==
Dirck Jansz Graeff play a rol in the historic roman Krone der Welt by Sabine Weiß.

== Literature ==
- Graeff, P. De (P. de Graeff Gerritsz en Dirk de Graeff van Polsbroek) Genealogie van de familie De Graeff van Polsbroek (Amsterdam, 1882)
- Bruijn, J. H. De Genealogie van het geslacht De Graeff van Polsbroek 1529/1827
- Brugmans, Hajo Geschiedenis van Amsterdam (1973)
