= Pieter Dircksz Graeff =

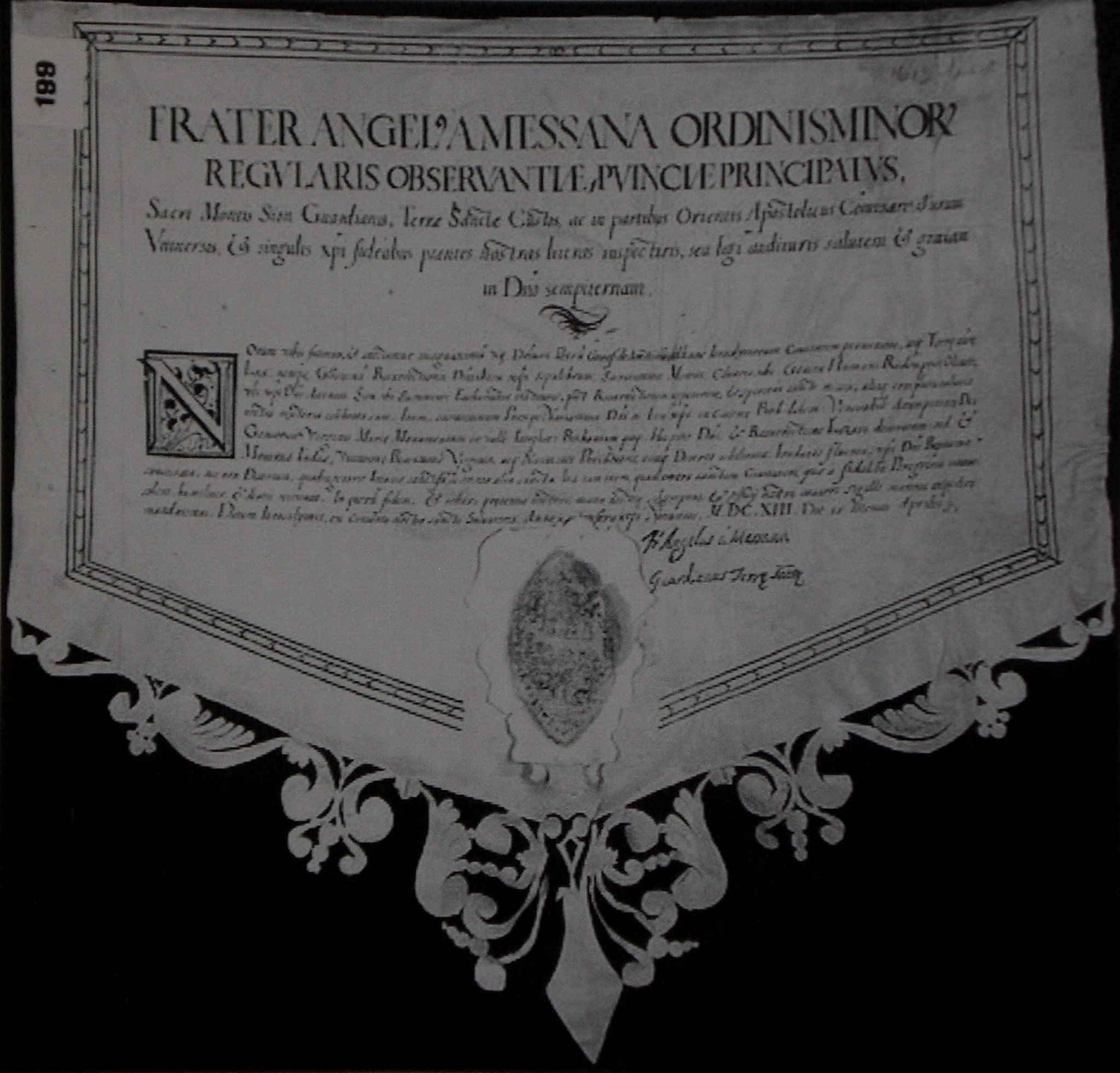
A document with the places visited by Pieter Dircksz Graeff in 1613 on his journey to the Holy Land

Pieter Dircksz Graeff (* 1574 in Amsterdam, † 27 July 1645 ibid) was a descendant of the Dutch regent family De Graeff. The Lord of Engelenburg was born as the third son of Dirk Jansz Graeff and Agniet Pietersdr van Neck.

== Life ==
Pieter Dircksz Graeff remained unmarried. In contrast to his Protestant family, he may was a follower of the catholic Religion. In Amsterdam he lived in a town house on the Fluweelenburgwal. In 1620 he bought the castle of Engelenburg (near Herwijnen at Gelderland) together with the associated manor from Jonker Willem Johansz van Gent. On December 30 of that year he was enfeoffed with this knightly court (Ridderhofstad) and seigniory. After his death, the husband of his niece Christina de Graeff (1609-1679), Jacob Bicker, was bequeathed the rights to the estate.

In 1613 he had made a journey to the Holy Land. In Jerusalem he received a document, which was prepared by the Franciscan friar Angelus a Messana, and which describes his visit to Christie's tomb. The document also includes the names of a number of the religious sites he visited there. Today the same is in the Amsterdam City Archives of the De Graeff family. He also traveled the historic caravan route from Jerusalem to Cairo with the Swiss Hans Jakob Ammann and two Italian travel companions. His burial place is in the Oude kerk. In his book Ammann named him "Edel und Vest Herr Peter Graffe" (noble and firm lord Peter Graffe).

== Coat of arms ==
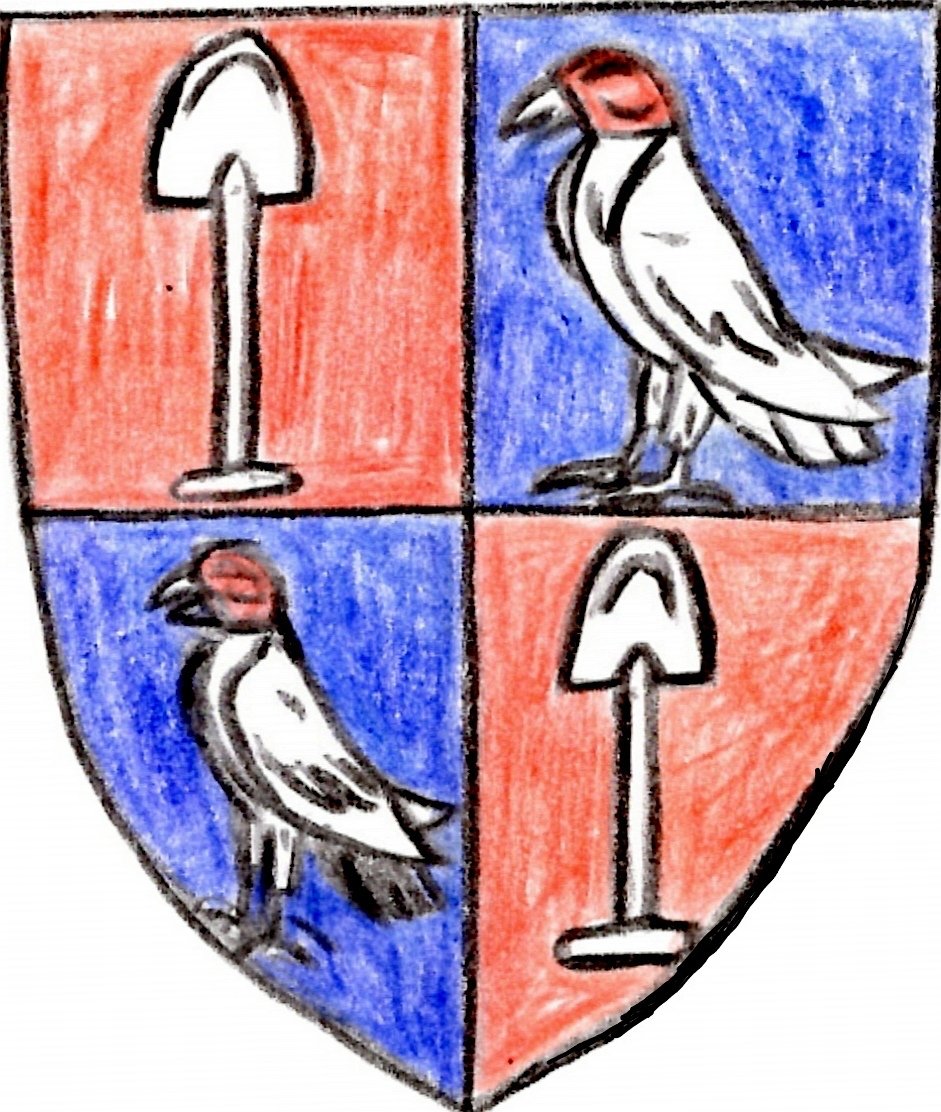
Coat of arms of origin

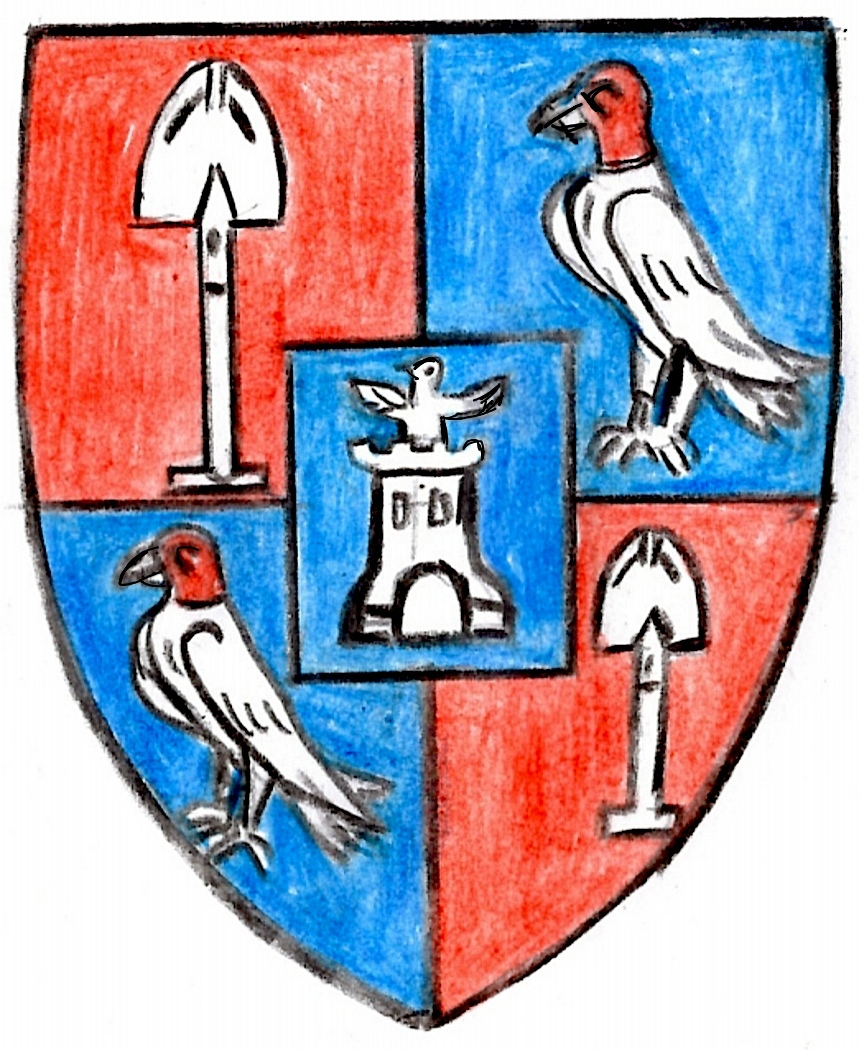
Coat of arms as Lord of Engelenburg. Since 1620, Graeff, as owner of the lordship of Engelenburg, has increased this with a blue Heart shield, charged with a silver castle, from which emerges a rising silver angel with outspread wings.

Pieter Dircksz Graeff's ancient coat of arms was quartered and showed the following symbols:

- field 1 (left above) the silver shovel on a red background of their paternal ancestors, the Herren von Graben
- field 2 (right above) it shows a silver falcon on a blue background. The origin of the falcon lies in the possession of the Valckeveen estate (later the Valckenburg estate) in Gooiland
- field 3 (left below), same as field 2
- field 4 (right below), same as field 1
- helmet covers in red and silver
- helm adornment shows an upright silver spade with ostrich feathers (Herren von Graben)
- motto: MORS SCEPTRA LIGONIBUS AEQUAT (DEATH MAKES SEPTRES AND HOES EQUAL)

Since 1620, Graeff, as owner of the lordship of Engelenburg, has increased this with a blue Heart shield, charged with a silver castle, from which emerges a rising silver angel with outspread wings.

== Trivia ==
- Pieter Dircksz Graeff (Pieter Dircksz de Graeff van Engelenburg) was mistakenly named as mayor of Amsterdam (as were other people in his family). He was not a member of the Vroedschap, the council or any other municipal government office.
- There is a painted portrait of Graeff with his coat of arms.

== Literature ==
- Ammann, Hans Jakob: "Hans Jakob Amman genannt der Thalwyler Schärer und seine Reise ins Gelobte Land". Zürich: Polygraph. Institut A. G. 1919 (Faksimile of the book from 1630)
