= Cornelis Hooft =

Dutch statesman and Amsterdam regent

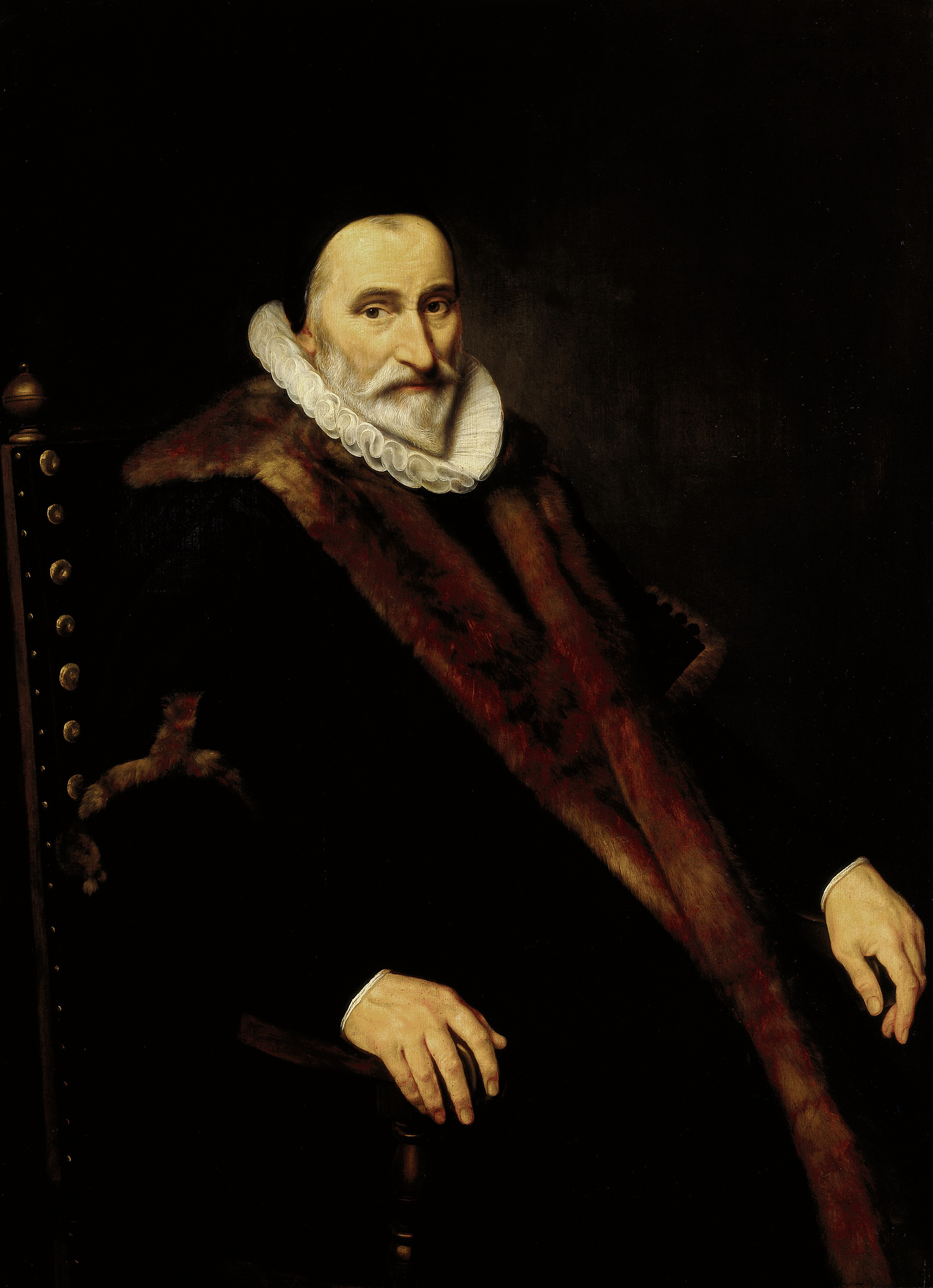
Cornelis Pietersz Hooft (1546-1626). (Cornelis van der Voort)

Cornelis Pietersz. Hooft (1547 – 1627 in Amsterdam) was a Dutch statesman and Amsterdam regent during the Golden Age.

== Life and work ==
Hooft Was a member of the patrician Hooft family, the son of the merchant Pieter Willemsz Hooft, and grandson of Willem Jansz Hooft, a Zaanse grain merchant and shipmaster. The poet and dramatist Pieter Corneliszoon Hooft was his son, Catharina Hooft - who married Cornelis de Graeff - his niece. Hooft himself held numerous positions in the administration of Amsterdam. He served, among other positions, as schepen, twelve times mayor, and treasurer in a period of fast growth, so that the city had to be expanded three times.

Cornelis' father established himself in Amsterdam. In 1566, the Protestant merchants around Hooft -- Jan Jacobsz Bal Huydecoper van Wieringen, Jacobsz Reael, Adriaan Pauw, and Dirck Jansz Graeff -- took over the social leadership within the city of Amsterdam in order to hold it in a political sense after the Alteratie of Amsterdam in 1578.

In 1569, he went into exile, but in 1574 came back from Königsberg and established himself in Hoorn. Then, in 1578, after the Alteratie on 26 May, he risked going back to Amsterdam. He lived on Nieuwendijk on the IJ. Hooft had been interested in theology, but was nevertheless tolerant - his wife Anna Jansdr Blaeu was a Mennonite, and he seems to have been a 'via media' man, declaring for neither the Remonstrants nor the Anti-Remonstrants.

As an independent merchant he had a large share in Baltic trade and reshipped herring, oil and grain. In 1584, he became a member of the vroedschap, in which he remained until its final session. In 1588, he was chosen as mayor. As a member of the government of Amsterdam, he was delegated to the States of Holland and through them to the States General. Hooft was opposed to the appointment of foreigners to important posts, pointing to the Flemish Calvinists and preachers such as Petrus Plancius. He resisted the expansion of the stadholder's power.

Hooft was critical on other points. In 1611, his role in the vroedschap came to an end, when he was appointed as weesmeester and commissaris (commissioner) of the Wisselbank.

Hooft was never concerned by the VOC or WIC, as the most Amsterdam mayors. Vondel praised him in his satirical work 'Roskam' as a reliable man and described him as "Hoofd vol kreuken, een geweten zonder rimpel" (a wrinkled brow, but a conscience without wrinkle). In 1618, stadholder Maurits of Orange, in his purge of Remonstrant regents from the vroedschap as a result of the Synod of Dort and the arrest of Johan van Oldenbarnevelt, spared Hooft, who took a neutral stance. He is buried in the Nieuwe Kerk.

== Sources ==
- S.A.C. Dudok van Heel, De Familie van Pieter Cornelisz Hooft in Jaarboek Centraal Bureau voor Genealogie, deel 35, 1981.
- K. ter Laan, Letterkundig woordenboek voor Noord en Zuid()
