= Jan Willem Cornelis Tellegen =

Dutch politician (1859-1921)

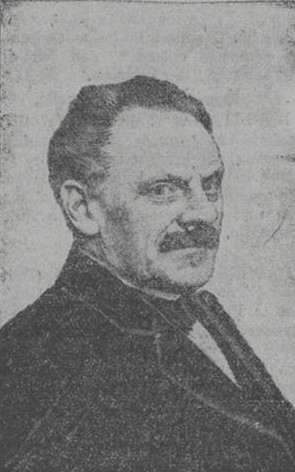
Jan Willem Cornelis Tellegen, 1915

Jan Willem Cornelis Tellegen (May 13, 1859 in Groningen – April 16, 1921 in Amsterdam) was mayor of Amsterdam from 1915 to 1921. Tellegen trained as a technical and civil engineer at the Polytechinal School in Delft, which became later the Delft University of Technology. For 11 years he was director of public works in Arnhem before becoming director of building and housing in Amsterdam, where, around 1905, he brought in building regulations to enforce the 1902 Housing Act. Though developers and architects complained the measures were too restrictive, they were very effective in producing "people's homes". He was political active in the Liberal Union. After splitting of the Free-thinking Democratic League in 1901, which stand up for universal suffrage, he became also active in this political party.

== Publications ==
- J.W.C. Tellegen (28 December 1895) 'Het nieuwe gebouw voor de Ambachtsschool en avondschool voor handwerkslieden te Arnhem', De Opmerker, 30e jaargang, nummer 52.
- J.W.C. Tellegen (8 February 1896) 'Het nieuwe gebouw voor de Ambachtsschool en Avondschool voor handwerkslieden te Arnhem', De Opmerker, 31e jaargang, nummer 6, pp. 42–44.

== Sources ==
- J. P. M.[ieras] (23 April 1921) 'J. W. C. Tellegen. †', Bouwkundig Weekblad, nr. 17, p. 105.
