= Andries Boelens =

Dutch politician (1455–1519)

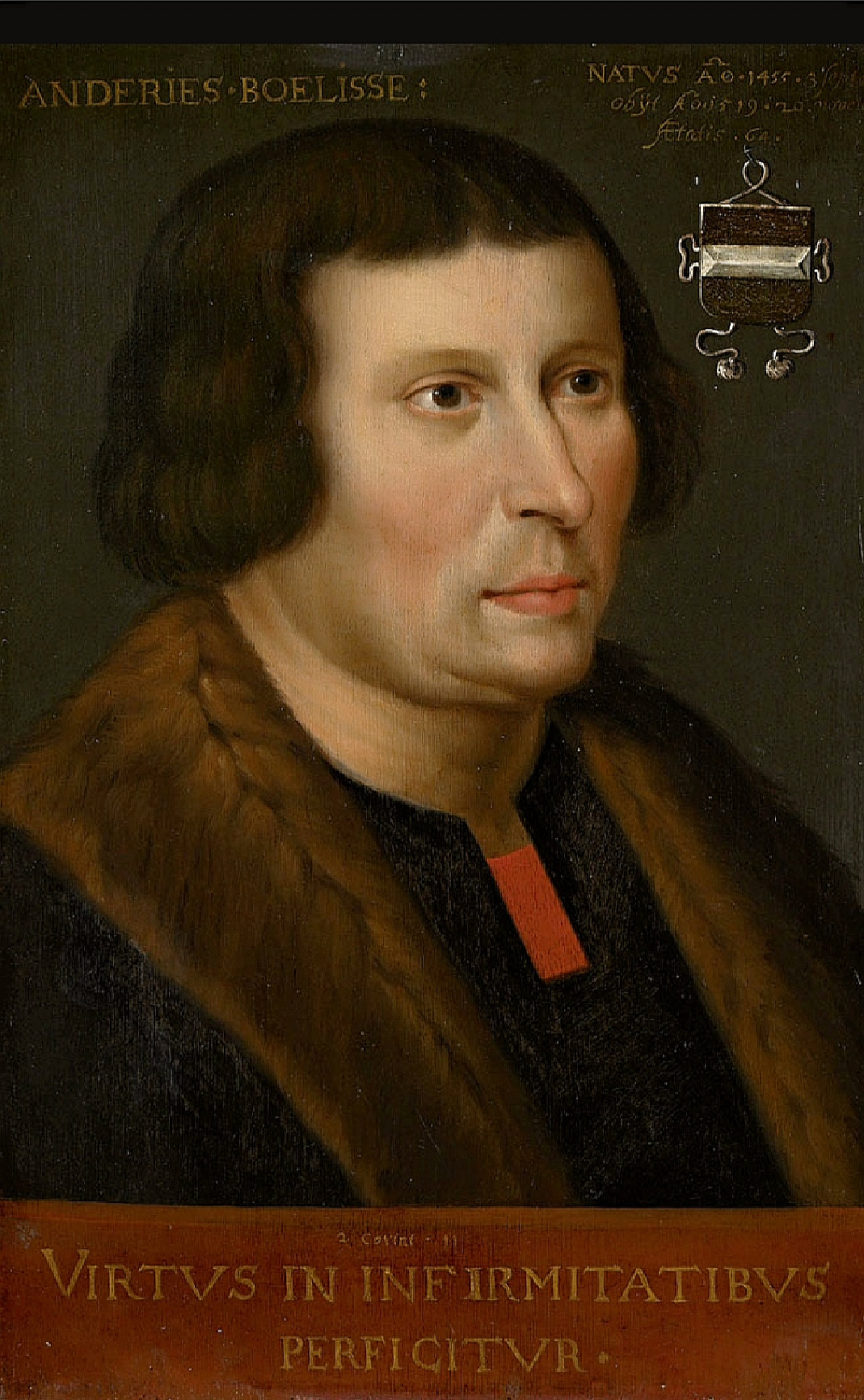
Andries Boelens (1455-1519), longtime burgomaster of Amsterdam and the most illustrious member of the Boelens family

Andries Boelens (Amsterdam, 1455 – there, 1519), also: Boelenz, Boelensz., Andries Boel Dircksz. or Andries Boelen Dircksz, was an alderman and mayor of Amsterdam. In the period from 1496 to 1517 he was mayor fifteen times. The term of his office is the first to be characterized as a period with a rather closed government elite. Because of this he was one of the founders of the Amsterdam oligarchy. Boelens is considered the progenitor of the Amsterdam regents of the Dutch Golden Age such as the De Graeff and Bicker families who largely claimed descent and their political legality from him.

== Biography ==
=== Family Boelens ===
Boelens coat of arms

Andries Boelens was the most illustrious member of the Boelens, a wealthy and important patrician family of Amsterdam. He was the son of Boel Dirck Boelens, who was mayor of Amsterdam from 1470 and died there in 1483, and Lijsbeth (Elisabeth) Allertsdr, died 1 September 1482. Andries' grandfather Dirck Boelens was mayor of Amsterdam three times, in 1447, 1453 and 1457. On his death he left his family large estates in the Amsterdam area, three houses in the city and a significant sum of money.

Andries Boelens married Maria Jansdr Beth, daughter of longtime mayor Jan Jansz Beth. With her he had eleven children, three of whom died in infancy. His daughter Geertruyd married Jan Martsz Merens (b. 1480). His daughter Lijsbeth was the wife of Cornelis Hendricksz Loen (1481–1547), who was mayor of Amsterdam three times between 1529 and 1533. This couple founded the Boelens Loen family line, from which several mayors of the city also emerged.

When Andries Boelens died in 1519, he left his son Albert Andriesz Boelens († 1551), mayor of Amsterdam nine times between 1520 and 1537, a fortune of 14,355 guilders, lands, ships and a house in Amsterdam. On 29 June 1525 Andries Boelen's wife Maria also died in Amsterdam.

=== Political career ===
Andries Boelens held the office of mayor of Amsterdam in the years 1496–1497, 1499, 1501–1502, 1504–1505, 1507–1510, 1512, 1514-1515 and 1517. In 1500 and 1503 he was a thesaurier ordinaris (treasurer) the city. He was supported by two brothers-in-law, Ruysch Jan Bethz and Floris Jansz den Otter, who were elected mayor twelve and thirteen times respectively.

Andries Boelens was therefore an important person in the politics of Amsterdam, but also the paterfamilias of the Boelens family, one of the most important families in the fifteenth and sixteenth century. He also represents another phenomenon in Amsterdam politics: if one of the first long-serving mayors, he co-founded an Amsterdam oligarchy, which ruled the town hall until 1795.

However, hardly anything is known about the significance of Andries Boelens for the city Amsterdam. Jan van Wieringen Ghijsbertsz believes in his study of the Boelens family that Andries has the right to wear the imperial crown on the coat of arms of Amsterdam obtained, because 'he lent to Emperor Maximilian, a good sum of gelts, by which he received des Emperor's favour, and for the City of Amsterdam, obtained the keyserlijcke crown on her weapons'. However, there is no evidence whatsoever of lending money to Maximilian of Austria by Boelens, let alone that Amsterdam has obtained the imperial crown at his Handys. The Dutch poet and writer Joost van den Vondel is the first to speak about the prestigious gift, which does not mean that his statements are wrong, but that no evidence has been found (yet) to support his claim.

== Legacy ==
=== De Graeff and Bicker ===
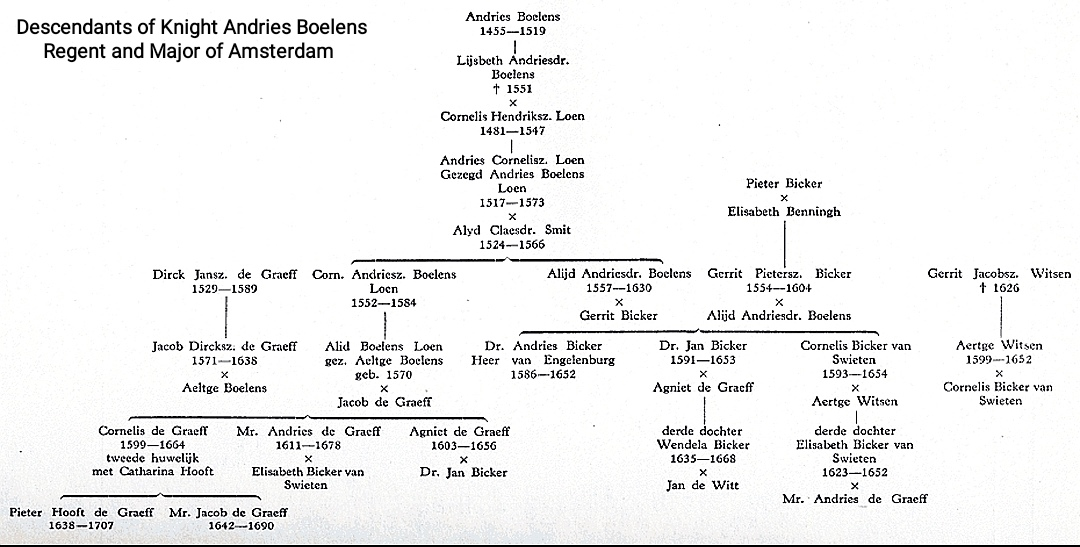
Descendants of Andries Boelens. Overview of the personal family relationships of the Amsterdam regent-dynasties Boelens Loen, De Graeff, Bicker (van Swieten), Witsen and Johan de Witt in the Dutch Golden Age

The eminent mayors of the Dutch Golden Age, Cornelis (1599-1664) and Andries de Graeff (1611-1678) and their cousins Andries (1586-1652) and Cornelis Bicker (1592-1654), saw themselves as the political heirs of the old regent family Boelens, whose main lineage, which had remained catholic, had died out in the male line in 1647. They had received the very significant first names Andries and Cornelis from their Boelens ancestors. As in a real dynasty, members of the two families frequently intermarried in the 17th century in order to keep their political and commercial capital together. Its great historical ancestor was Andries Boelens, the city's most influential medieval mayor. Both families, Bicker and De Graeff, descend in the female line from Boelens.

=== Joost van den Vondel ===
Joost van den Vondel alludes several times to a relationship between Amsterdam's right to use the imperial crown and the actions of Andries Boelens. In De Inwijdinge van 't Stadhuuis 't Amsterdam, one of the praise and honor rhymes, Vondel suggests a direct connection between the crowning of the coat of arms cross shield and the gout (gold) of the helt (hero) Boelens (who here in poetic freedom of the title Knight is provided).

Waerna Maxmiliaen, Roomsch Koning, hoogh ge-eert,

Haer' wapenkruisschilt kroont met diamante straelen,
En parlen van zijn kroone, om eeuwighlijck te praelen,
Als met een danckbaer merck van zijne majesteit,

Voor Ridder Boelens gout, en 's helts grootdaedigheit,

In his Amstelodamiana (1874) historian Jan ter Gouw expresses his doubts about Vondel's suggestion that the gold came from Boelen's purse: Vondel poeticized that Amsterdam obtained that crown "for Ridder Boelens gout," but this was already contradicted by his contemporaries. However, Mr. J. van Lennep believed it, and considered it an 'important circumstance'.

Vondel's ode to the Amsterdam regent Cornelis de Graeff, a descendant of Boelens: Op de Wapenkroon van Amsterdam begins with the verses:

Indien men uwen gryzen stam,

Ter heerschappij des lants geschapen,
En die 's lants vryburg Amsterdam
Gekroont heeft met de kroon van 't wapen,
Den lauwer schonk, die niet verdort,
Noch schoot de dankbaarheid te kort.
Had Andries niet Stadts eer bewaert,
En 's Keizers glori trouw verdadight,
August had met zijn edel swaert
Den Ridder spader begenadight,
Wiens miltheit Oostenryck behaegt

Daer Amstels schilt de kroon afdraagt.

== Literature ==
- J. van Wieringen Ghijsbertsz., Het patriciaat van Amsterdam, vertegenwoordigd door de genealogie van 't geslacht Boelens, met aangehuwde familiën en nakomelingschap. Neuausgabe von J.A. Alberdingk Thijm. Amsterdam 1881, p 1–58.
- Jan Wagenaar: Amsterdam in zyne opkomst, aanwas, geschiedenissen, voorregenten, koophandel, gebouwen, kerkenstaat, schoolen, schutterye, gilden en regeeringe. Amsterdam 1768
- S. A. C. Dudok van Heel, Oligarchieën in Amsterdam voor de Alteratie van 1578, dl.1, p 36-37
