= Edward Voûte =

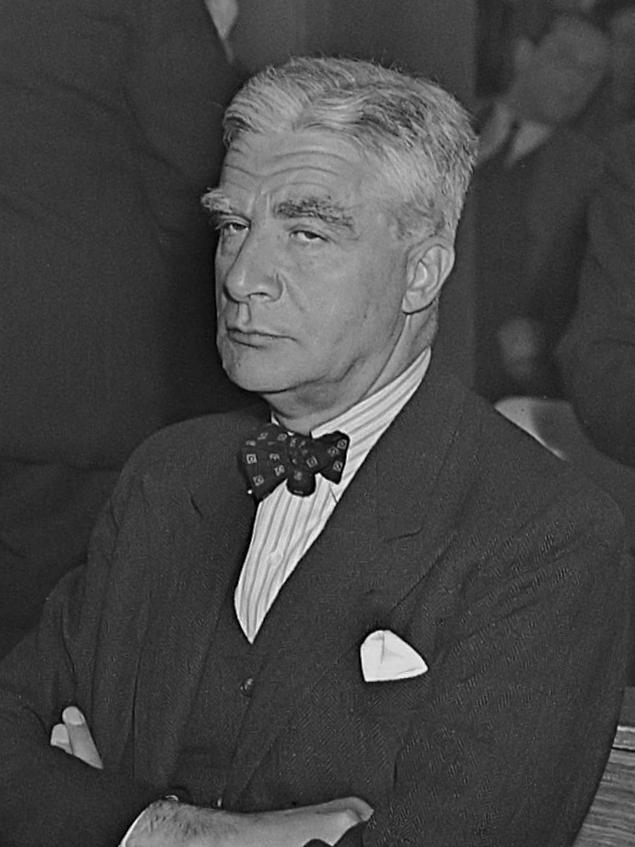
- Edward Voûte during trial

Mayor of Amsterdam
- In office 3 March 1941 – 5 May 1945
- Preceded by: Willem de Vlugt
- Succeeded by: Feike de Boer

Personal details
- Born: Edward John Voûte; 17 September 1887 Amsterdam, Netherlands
- Died: 18 June 1950 (aged 62) Amsterdam, Netherlands

Edward John Voûte (17 September 1887 – 18 June 1950) was the Mayor of Amsterdam from 1941 to 1945, during the German occupation of the Netherlands.

== Early life and education ==
Edward John Voûte was born on 17 September 1887 in Amsterdam in the Netherlands. He was the son of Meinhard Voûte and Catharine Henriette Perk. In 1890, the family moved to Batavia in the Dutch East Indies. At age eleven, Voûte was sent back to the Netherlands to live with his aunt in Arnhem. He attended the Hogere Burgerschool in Arnhem and studied at the Royal Naval College (1907–1910) in Den Helder.

== Career ==
Voûte worked as an officer in the Royal Netherlands Navy until 1915, when he was honorably discharged. He then worked as an inspector at Koninklijke Hollandsche Lloyd. From 1941 to 1945, during the German occupation of the Netherlands, he was mayor of Amsterdam. After World War II, he was arrested for his collaboration with the Nazis. In 1946, he was sentenced to 6 years in prison, which was later reduced to 3.5 years. He died at the age of 62, one year after his release from prison, on 18 June 1950 in Amsterdam.

Political offices
Preceded by Willem de Vlugt	Mayor of Amsterdam; 1941–1945	Succeeded by Feike de Boer
