= Hans Vijlbrief =

Dutch politician (born 1963)

His Excellency Hans Vijlbrief
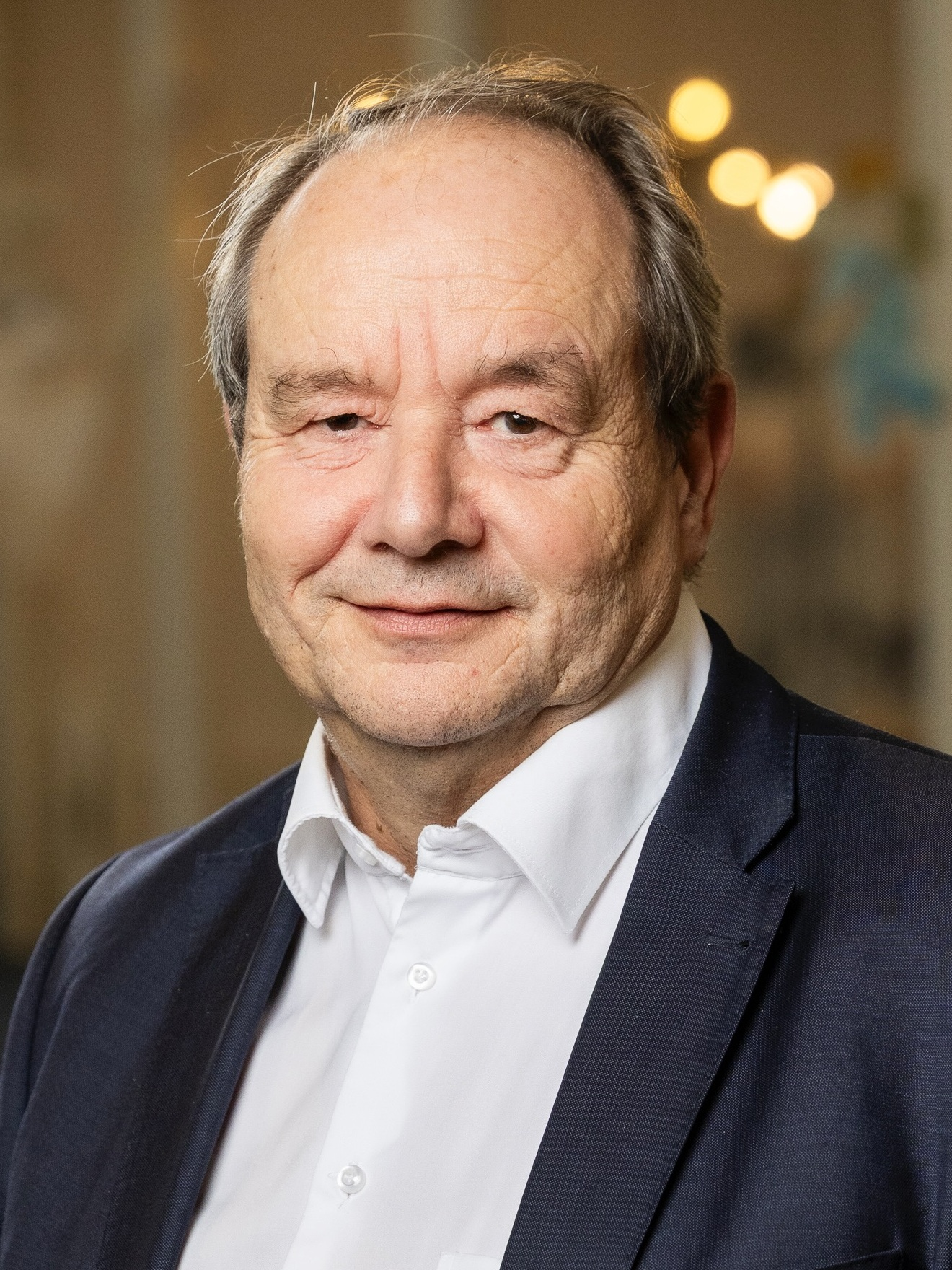
- Vijlbrief in 2026

Minister of Social Affairs and Employment
- Incumbent
- Assumed office 23 February 2026
- Prime Minister: Rob Jetten
- Preceded by: Mariëlle Paul

State Secretary for the Extractive Industries
- In office 10 January 2022 – 2 July 2024
- Prime Minister: Mark Rutte
- Succeeded by: Eddie van Marum

State Secretary for Finance
- In office 29 January 2020 – 10 January 2022 Serving with Alexandra van Huffelen
- Prime Minister: Mark Rutte
- Preceded by: Menno Snel
- Succeeded by: Marnix van Rij

Member of the House of Representatives
- In office 6 December 2023 – 23 February 2026
- In office 31 March 2021 – 10 January 2022
- Succeeded by: Hind Dekker-Abdulaziz

President of the Eurogroup Working Group
- In office 1 February 2018 – 29 January 2020
- Preceded by: Thomas Wieser
- Succeeded by: Tuomas Saarenheimo

Treasurer-General
- In office 1 July 2011 – 1 February 2018
- Preceded by: Ronald Gerritse
- Succeeded by: Christiaan Rebergen

Personal details
- Born: Johannes Alexander Vijlbrief; 17 August 1963 (age 63) Voorschoten, South Holland
- Party: Democrats 66
- Spouse: Manouche Hetzler
- Children: 2
- Education: Vrije Universiteit (MSc, PhD)

Johannes Alexander "Hans" Vijlbrief (born 17 August 1963) is a Dutch politician currently serving as the minister of social affairs and employment for the social-liberal party Democrats 66 (D66). He previously served as a state secretary in the Fourth Rutte cabinet.

Vijlbrief started his career at the Ministry of Economic Affairs, after earning his doctorate at the Vrije Universiteit Amsterdam in 1992. Subsequently, he worked at the Bureau for Economic Policy Analysis (CPB) before returning to Economic Affairs, where he filled several positions as director and director-general. Vijlbrief was appointed Treasurer-General of the Ministry of Finance in 2011, and occupied that post until he became president of the advisory body Eurogroup Working Group six and a half years later. He had been a member of that group while serving as Treasurer-General, assisting Eurogroup President Jeroen Dijsselbloem.

Just after he had been re-elected at the working group, Vijlbrief was appointed State Secretary for Finance together with Alexandra van Huffelen in January 2020. He succeeded Menno Snel, who had resigned as a result of the childcare benefits scandal, and became responsible for the Tax Administration and tax affairs. Vijlbrief was elected to the House of Representatives in 2021, but he left this position upon his appointment as State Secretary for the Extractive Industries as part of the new fourth Rutte cabinet in January 2022. He was again elected to the House in November 2023, and his term as state secretary ended in July 2024.

== Early life and education ==
Vijlbrief was born on 17 August 1963 in Voorschoten, a village in South Holland close to Leiden. His father, Johan, was a sales manager at beverage company Riedel and would later found his own bottler.

He attended the high school Visser 't Hooft Lyceum in Leiden, earning his atheneum diploma in 1981. Thereafter, he studied at Vrije Universiteit Amsterdam where he obtained an MSc degree in general economics in 1987. He continued studying at the university, receiving his PhD in economics in 1992. His dissertation was titled Unemployment insurance and the Dutch labour market.

== Early career ==
After obtaining his doctorate, Vijlbrief started working at the Ministry of Economic Affairs, where he filled a number of positions at the directorate General Economic Policy. Minister Hans Wijers appointed him as interim director of that division in 1997. Besides, he became director at Erasmus University Rotterdam of the Research Centre for Financial Economic Policy, a part-time job, the next year.

He left the Ministry to work as deputy director at the Bureau for Economic Policy Analysis (CPB) in 1999. Vijlbrief has told that he later came to regret the move, calling the agency "too quiet" and lacking in pressure. He also became an endowed professor in 2000 at the Vrije Universiteit, his alma mater, specialized in economic policy, and he simultaneously quit his job in Rotterdam.

Vijlbrief returned to the Ministry of Economic Affairs in 2001 in the position of director of General Economic Policy. In July 2004, Minister Laurens Jan Brinkhorst promoted him to Director-General for Economic Policy. While in this position, Vijlbrief also chaired a re-evaluation group called "Security and Terrorism" (2009–2010).

Starting in February 2010, he served as Director-General for Energy, Telecommunications, and Markets. Vijlbrief's former position was subsequently eliminated. Its responsibilities were transferred to the secretary-general (general economic policy and EU matters) and his new job (competition and consumer policy). His professorship at the Vrije Universiteit came to an end that same year. Vijlbrief, who had been a member of D66 since 2008, also became more politically involved, helping write the party's election program for the 2010 general election. Moreover, Vijlbrief led Maria van der Hoeven's successful campaign to get appointed Executive Director of the International Energy Agency in 2011.

== Treasurer-General and Eurogroup Working Group (2011–20) ==
Vijlbrief served as the Treasurer-General of the Ministry of Finance starting in July 2011, after he was appointed by the Council of Ministers. His predecessor, Ronald Gerritse, had vacated the position when he became chairman of the Authority for the Financial Markets. The position also included membership of the Eurogroup Working Group (EWG), an advisory body responsible for preparing the monthly meetings of the Eurogroup. Besides, Vijlbrief was chairman of the Economic Policy Committee, a European advisory body, between 2012 and 2014.

In his position at the Eurogroup, Vijlbrief worked for a number of years together with Jeroen Dijsselbloem, when he was Minister of Finance and President of the Eurogroup, on handling the Greek and European debt crises. He also managed the two campaigns to get Dijsselbloem elected Eurogroup president. In March 2014, Vijlbrief was chosen to chair the board of the European Financial Stability Facility (EFSF), the eurozone's emergency fund to address government debt. He had been a member of the body's board since 2011 and was also serving on its Risk Committee. That same month, Vijlbrief became a member of the board of the European economic think tank Bruegel. During the 2017 Dutch general election season, he was a co-author of D66's election program.

Vijlbrief left the ministry, the EFSF, and Bruegel in 2018 to become the President of the Eurogroup Working Group starting on 1 February, succeeding Thomas Wieser. He was elected by the members of the EWG in December after his candidacy had received support from the Dutch cabinet and his only opponent had withdrawn. The decision was later ratified by the Eurogroup itself. Vijlbrief simultaneously became president of the Economic and Financial Committee. While leading the EWG, he unsuccessfully worked on creating a common European deposit insurance. Vijlbrief also started working as endowed professor at the University of Amsterdam specialized in European economic and financial policy in September 2018. When his two-year term as president was about to end, Vijlbrief was reappointed for another term in December 2019.

== State Secretary for Finance (2020–22) ==
After State Secretary for Finance Menno Snel resigned in December 2019, it was made public on 26 January that he would be succeeded by Vijlbrief and Alexandra van Huffelen. Snel resigned after thousands of recipients of childcare benefits had been wrongfully considered fraudsters and had been forced to pay back the money. Some of them had received mostly blacked out pages after they had asked for their records. Weeks before Vijlbrief and Van Huffelen were put forward, Minister of Finance Wopke Hoekstra had decided that benefits (toeslagen) and customs would be spun off from the Tax Administration.

Vijlbrief was sworn in as "State Secretary for Finance - Tax Affairs and the Tax Administration" by King Willem-Alexander at palace Huis ten Bosch on 29 January. His colleague, Van Huffelen, became in charge of benefits and customs. Vijlbrief became responsible for tax affairs; Tax Administration (including the FIOD); financial relations between the national government and decentralized governments; export credit insurance and facilities; Holland Casino and the Dutch Lottery; currency; and Domains Movable Property. He is also in charge of working out plans for aviation and carbon taxes. Simultaneously with his appointment, he resigned from his positions at the Eurogroup and the University of Amsterdam. Shortly before his term started, Vijlbrief declared that he was planning "to make the Tax Administration boring again".

=== Taxation ===
One week after his appointment as State Secretary, Vijlbrief announced that the organization would start working with construction and health care trade associations in order to tackle pseudo self-employment. He also said that the organization would work with trade associations in other sectors later on. Vijlbrief's aviation tax on all plane tickets passed the House of Representatives in April 2020.

In June, he announced that he would not follow through on his predecessor's plan to overhaul the savings and investment tax system, calling the plan legally untenable. Snel wanted to tax savings and investments based on their respective expected returns, causing taxes on savings to decrease and taxes on stocks and other investments to increase. A year later, after an investigation, Vijlbrief advised the next cabinet to change the savings and investment taxes such that they reflect actual returns.

The Tax Administration announced in May 2020 that it would introduce a new tax on dividends in 2024 in order to counter tax avoidance. After the cabinet's resignation in 2021, Vijlbrief advocated introducing a code of conduct to fight tax avoidance by multinationals. Besides, he said that he welcomed the European Commission's more ambitious agenda concerning the issue and that he approved of a deal in the run-up to the 47th G7 summit to commit towards a global minimum corporate tax rate.

=== Childcare benefits scandal ===
At the end of February 2020, Trouw and RTL Nieuws reported that the Tax Administration had been using a blacklist containing the names of about 180,000 suspected fraudsters called the Fraude Signaleringsvoorziening. An internal report had concluded one year earlier that the list violated privacy legislation. The plug was pulled on the blacklist after journalists had obtained the report – days before the news articles were published. Vijlbrief sent a letter to the House of Representatives disclosing the blacklist two days after it had been revealed. He also told the House that officials at the Tax Administration had unjustly blacked out a paragraph about the blacklist in a document that the organization had been forced to disclose earlier in order to cover up the story. Vijlbrief's predecessor had repeatedly denied the existence of such a list. Vijlbrief called the list an unpleasant surprise and called the problems of the Tax Administration "enormous". In the surrounding weeks, he had to inform the House about a number of other issues concerning the organization; the Tax Administration had not paid back wrongful reminder fees, there had been small mistakes in the calculation of two tax rates, and the organization had failed to collect debts before becoming statute-barred.

In May 2020, Vijlbrief and Van Huffelen filed a criminal complaint for official misconduct against the Tax Administration they lead in reaction to the childcare benefits scandal. They alleged that civil servants had knowingly collected money from citizens who did not owe money and that they had discriminated on the basis of race. In addition, four high-ranking officials were asked to step aside. The public prosecutor's office later announced that it would not conduct a criminal investigation despite the criminal complaint. When Trouw and RTL Nieuws reported in July that the Tax Administration had wrongfully labeled citizens paying income tax as fraudsters based on suspicions, Vijlbrief and Van Huffelen temporarily shut down the registration systems for fraud.

An investigation concluded in late 2021 that the Tax Administration's blacklist had included people who had not committed fraud and that between 5,000 and 15,000 of them had possibly been wrongfully denied debt restructuring because of their listing. Vijlbrief subsequently told that he was looking into compensating victims.

=== COVID-19 pandemic ===
After the COVID-19 pandemic had reached the Netherlands, the cabinet announced on 12 March 2020 that businesses with financial difficulties would be able to postpone tax payments as soon as they submitted a request. The next week, the procedure was simplified and the interest rate on the debts was lowered to almost zero percent. Around 240,000 companies had taken advantage of the possibility by August. Vijlbrief also introduced a number of other measures: he and Minister Sigrid Kaag relaxed the application conditions for export credit insurance, he created a €12 billion safety net to guarantee the payment of credit insurance, he made it possible for businesses to deduct their losses from their corporate tax bill earlier, and he and Minister Kajsa Ollongren provided €1.5 billion to aid municipal and provincial governments. Vijlbrief and his colleague Eric Wiebes also assisted in saving shipbuilder Royal IHC from bankruptcy.

Vijlbrief decided in June that companies registered in tax havens would not be eligible for subsidies related to the COVID-19 pandemic. The cabinet later proposed an additional measure worth €4 billion called the Baangerelateerde Investeringskorting (BIK) to stimulate the economy: companies would be able to deduct investments from their payroll tax bill in the following two years. Opposition parties in the House of Representatives attacked the program, calling it a handout to corporations. The cabinet later withdrew the plan after it had received an indication from the European Commission that the plan would likely constitute state aid and that it would therefore be rejected.

=== Cabinet resignation and 2021 election ===
When the third Rutte cabinet resigned on 15 January 2021 due to the childcare benefits scandal, Vijlbrief became demissionary state secretary and stayed in that position until the installation of the fourth Rutte cabinet in January 2022. He ran for member of parliament in the March 2021 general election, appearing as the twelfth candidate on D66's party list. He was elected with 947 preference votes. Due to his position as demissionary state secretary, D66 did not give Vijlbrief a specialty in the House or permanent membership of any committee. He vacated his seat when he became state secretary in January 2022.

== State Secretary for the Extractive Industries (2022–24) ==
Vijlbrief became State Secretary for the Extractive Industries on 10 January 2022, when the fourth Rutte cabinet was sworn in by the king. He was part of the Ministry of Economic Affairs and Climate Policy, and he was mainly concerned with damage and problems in the province of Groningen caused by earthquakes induced by natural gas extraction from the Groningen field. His complete portfolio was National Mines Inspectorate, mining, gas extraction Groningen and consequences (both claims handling and reinforcement), Groningen Mining Damage Institute, National Coordinator for Groningen, and competition policy. Vijlbrief decided to work from Groningen a few days a month to connect with its citizens.

=== Induced earthquakes in Groningen ===
The previous cabinet had promised that extraction from the Groningen field, active since 1963, would be stopped as soon as possible. However, less than a week prior to Vijlbrief's swearing in, his predecessor – Minister of Economic Affairs and Climate Policy Stef Blok – had announced that the planned gas extraction in 2021/22 would be increased from 3.9 billion cubic metres (140×10^{9} cu ft) to 7.6 billion cubic metres (270×10^{9} cu ft) due to a delay in the construction of a nitrogen plant, which would allow for higher gas imports, and due to a rise in contractual deliveries to Germany. Besides, on Vijlbrief's first day in office, applications for a €220 million subsidy fund to provide €10,000 to people living inside Groningen's seismic zone opened, which ran out of money on that same day. Vijlbrief decided to raise the amount of money allocated to the subsidy by €250 million days later. He also told on his first day as state secretary that he would look if he could do anything about the increased gas extraction before a deadline on 1 April, and he finally announced the extraction for 2021/22 would end up being 4.5 billion cubic metres (160×10^{9} cu ft) as a result of a warm winter and a more efficient utilization of existing nitrogen plants.

The Russian invasion of Ukraine at the same time led to increasing natural gas prices and to European countries wanting to become less energy-dependent on Russia. Vijlbrief clarified that the Groningen gas field would not be used to compensate except for in the most extreme of conditions. He cited a report by the National Mines Inspectorate, which stated that it would be dangerous for Groningen inhabitants due to the threat of earthquakes, but ignored another report by the Mijnraad, which stated that not preparing for additional extraction could threaten a reliable supply of gas. Vijlbrief reaffirmed that gas extraction would be lowered to the amount necessary to maintain the possibility of scaling up in October 2022 and that extraction would be halted entirely in 2023 or 2024. The cabinet definitively decided in late September to extract 2.8 billion cubic metres (99×10^{9} cu ft) in 2022/23 – the minimum quantity. European Commissioner for Internal Market Thierry Breton unsuccessfully called on the Dutch government to reconsider its decision as a result of continuing gas supply issues on the continent.

A parliamentary inquiry into the gas extraction published its report in February 2023 and concluded that profits had been prioritized over the safety of the inhabitants of Groningen. Vijlbrief declared that "the people of Groningen had been right all along". Vijlbrief had also been questioned by the committee for his roles starting as Director-General for Energy, Telecommunications, and Markets. Vijlbrief and Prime Minister Mark Rutte visited Garmerwolde in Groningen in May 2023 to apologize in response to the report. The cabinet announced €22 billion would be spent on Groningen – including €13.5 billion in new funds – to repair damage, to reinforce buildings, and to invest in the province for a period of 30 years – the latter to pay off a debt of honor. The province had demanded €30 billion in investments alone. The cabinet announced the following month that gas extraction in Groningen would be ceased starting 1 October 2023. Gas wells would be dismantled a year later to still allow for extraction in the meantime in case of emergency. Due to cold weather, limited gas extraction was restarted in January 2024. Vijlbrief introduced a bill to make the wells unusable, and he threatened to resign when the Senate voted to postpone its treatment. The bill was passed in April 2024.

To make homes earthquake-resistant, Vijlbrief gave the go-ahead in 2022 for an operation to systematically strengthen all structures in the villages of Garrelsweer, Zeerijp, Wirdum, and Leermens. In June of that year, he decided to take legal action against the NAM for not paying €190 million it owed in earthquake damage compensation. The government had billed the NAM €560 million in total since 2020, but the NAM had doubts about the justification for part of that figure.

=== End of fourth Rutte cabinet ===
The fourth Rutte cabinet collapsed on 7 July 2023 due to disagreements over asylum reforms and continued as a caretaker government. Vijlbrief's term as state secretary ended on 2 July 2024, when the Schoof cabinet was sworn in.

== House of Representatives (since 2023) ==
The collapse of the fourth Rutte cabinet triggered a November 2023 general election, and Vijlbrief was appointed chair of the committee tasked with writing D66's program. He decided to run for the House of Representatives despite having before mentioned he would retire. He was elected as D66's third candidate, while the party won nine seats in total. When the Schoof cabinet proposed to raise the sales tax on hotel stays, sports, culture, books, and newspapers from 9% to 21% in its 2025 budget, Vijlbrief unsuccessfully negotiated on behalf of opposition parties with the governing coalition to find an alternative measure to raise funding. Minister of Finance Eelco Heinen later promised the House that he would look for alternatives to the tax increase for sports, culture, books, and newspapers.

=== House committees ===
- Committee for Asylum and Migration (chair)
- Public Expenditure committee
- Committee for Finance
- Committee for Social Affairs and Employment
- Committee for Housing and Spatial Planning

== Personal life ==
Vijlbrief is married and has a son and a daughter. He met his wife, Manouche Hetzler, while he was studying at the Vrije Universiteit. His son, Sam, is also politically active, having been elected to the Kaag en Braassem municipal council in the 2022 elections on behalf of D66. Vijlbrief currently resides in the South Holland village of Woubrugge, and he is a supporter of football club Feyenoord.

== Electoral history ==
Electoral history of Hans Vijlbrief
Year	Body	Party	Pos.	Votes	Result		Ref.
Year	Body	Party	Pos.	Votes	Party seats	Individual	Ref.
2021	House of Representatives	Democrats 66	12	947	24	Won	
2023	House of Representatives	Democrats 66	3	10,067	9	Won	
2025	House of Representatives	Democrats 66	3	18,215	26	Won	

Political offices
Preceded by Menno Snel	State Secretary for Finance; 2020–2022; Served alongside: Alexandra van Huffelen	Succeeded by Marnix van Rij
Office created	State Secretary for the Extractive Industries; 2022–2024	Succeeded by Eddie van Marum
Civic offices
Preceded by Ronald Gerritse	Treasurer-General; 2011–2018	Succeeded by Christiaan Rebergen
Diplomatic posts
Preceded by Thomas Wieser	President of the Eurogroup Working Group; 2018–2020	Succeeded by Tuomas Saarenheimo
