= Menno Snel =

Dutch politician

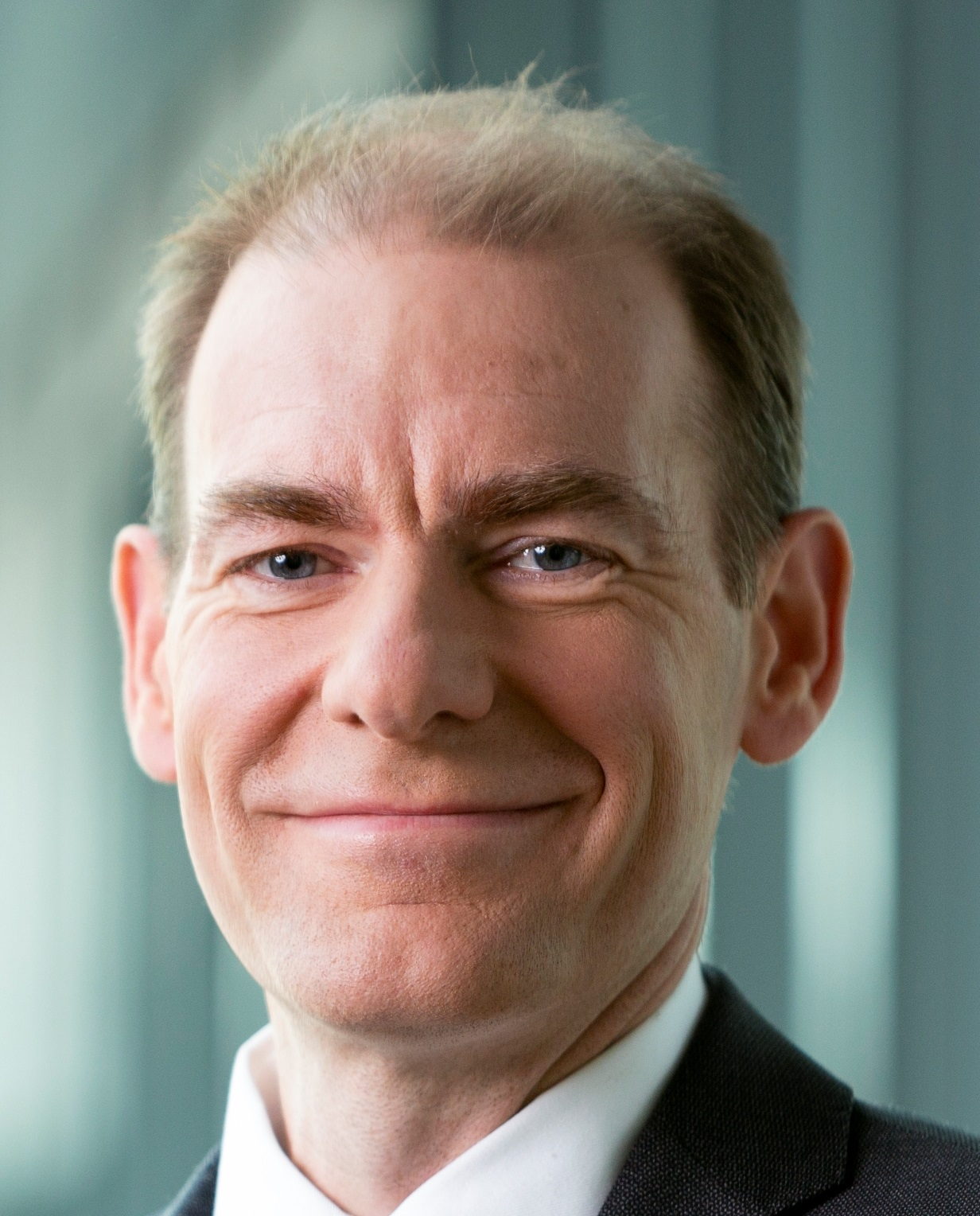
- Snel in 2018

State Secretary for Finance
- In office 26 October 2017 – 18 December 2019
- Prime Minister: Mark Rutte
- Preceded by: Eric Wiebes
- Succeeded by: Alexandra van Huffelen; Hans Vijlbrief

Personal details
- Born: Menno Snel; 29 October 1970 (age 55) Vleuten-De Meern, Netherlands
- Party: Democrats 66 (from 2017)
- Education: University of Groningen (Bachelor of Economics, Master of Economics)
- Occupation: Politician · civil servant · Economist · Banker · Financial adviser · Corporate director

Menno Snel (born 29 October 1970) is a Dutch politician. A member of the Democrats 66 (D66) party, he served as State Secretary for Finance from 26 October 2017 until his resignation on 18 December 2019.

== Education ==
Snel was born in Vleuten-De Meern in the province of Utrecht. He studied general economics between 1988 and 1994 at the University of Groningen, where he was a board member at the student association RKSV Albertus Magnus.

== Career ==
=== Professional life ===
After graduation, he worked at the Dutch bank MeesPierson. In 1995, he joined the Ministry of Finance, of which a while as the Deputy Director-General for Fiscal Affairs, a position he was appointed in at age 33. During his time at the Finance Ministry, he worked on various dossiers, including the budget policy (most notably the Zalmnorm instituted by Gerrit Zalm) and international tax competition between countries.

He later worked for the pension fund APG, where he held from 2009 to 2011 the position of director strategy and policy. Between 2011 and 2016 he worked in Washington, D.C. with the International Monetary Fund (IMF) in its daily governance and on 1 September 2016 he was appointed as chairman of the board of the Nederlandse Waterschapsbank.

=== Politics ===
On 26 October 2017, Snel joined the newly formed Third Rutte cabinet as State Secretary for Finance. He joined the Democrats 66 (D66) a short while before his appointment and was considered a surprise and technical appointment by many. His portfolio includes Fiscal Affairs, Lower Governmental Finances, the Royal Dutch Mint, Holland Casino and the State Lottery. His primary challenge is expected to be the reform of the Tax and Customs Administration, which went through a lot of turmoil in the recent past.

Later, Snel was accused of (knowingly) unlawfully reclaiming subsidies paid out to citizens, for children, thus forcing these citizens into bankruptcies or lifelong repayment schemes. At least 300 parents have been affected, but were promised reimbursement by the government. The government has accused the Tax Service as a whole responsible. Employees were afraid to speak out in fear of losing their jobs. Hints of fraud have been hinted at from as early as 2014.

In January 2021 this Netherlands child welfare fraud scandal led the cabinet Rutte to collectively decide to resign and to continue as a demissionary cabinet until the planned 2021 Dutch general election.

In 2022, Snel became the Netherlands’ nominee to succeed Klaus Regling as Managing Director of the European Stability Mechanism.

Political offices
Preceded by Eric Wiebes	State Secretary for Finance; 2017–2019	Succeeded by Hans Vijlbrief and Alexandra van Huffelen
