= Christiaan Rebergen =

Dutch civil servant (born 1970)

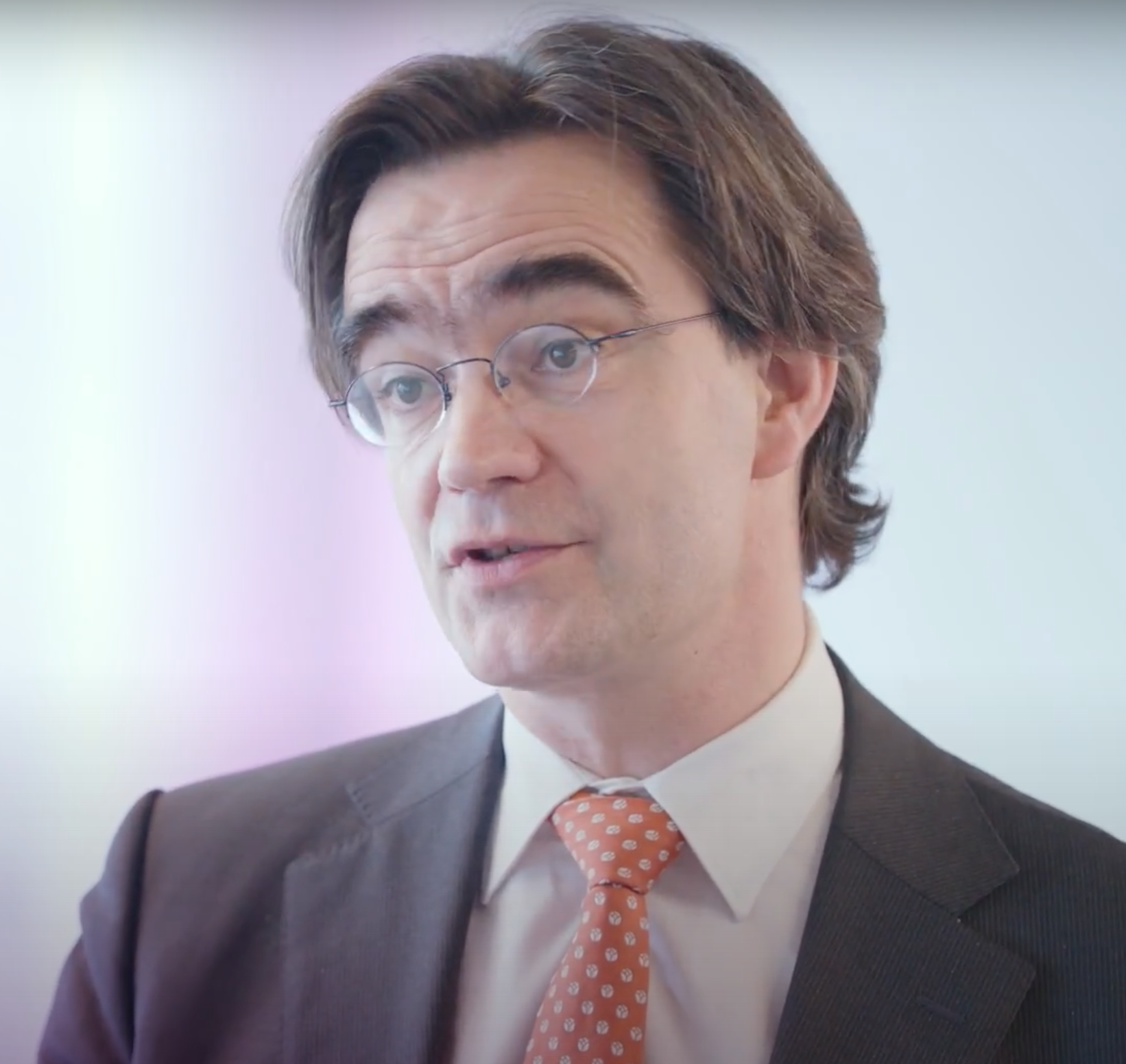

Secretary-General of the Ministry of Foreign Affairs
- Incumbent
- Assumed office 1 July 2024
- Preceded by: Paul Huijts

Treasurer-General at the Ministry of Finance
- In office 1 June 2018 – 1 July 2024
- Preceded by: Hans Vijlbrief
- Succeeded by: Jasper Wesseling

Personal details
- Born: A.C.C. Rebergen; 29 May 1970 (age 56) Ede, Netherlands
- Children: 4
- Education: Vrije Universiteit Amsterdam

A.C.C. Rebergen (born 29 May 1970) is a Dutch civil servant who has served as the Secretary-General of the Ministry of Foreign Affairs since 2024. He previously served as Treasurer-General at the Ministry of Finance from 2018 to 2024.

== Education and career ==
Rebergen studied general economics at the Vrije Universiteit Amsterdam after receiving his VWO diploma at the Christelijk Streeklyceum in Ede in 1988. Rebergen graduated seven years later and started working at the Ministry of Finance.

Rebergen continued serving there with a hiatus at the House of Representatives until 2002, when he took a job at the Ministry of Foreign Affairs. He served as the interim director of Sustainable Economic Development at the ministry between 2006 and March 2012. Additionally, he served as the Ambassador for the Millennium Development Goals during the last two of those years. Rebergen was subsequently promoted to interim Director-General International Cooperation and became the permanent director-general at the end of 2014.

Rebergen returned to the Finance Ministry in June 2018 to serve as Treasurer-General, succeeding Hans Vijlbrief, who had vacated the position to become president of the Eurogroup Working Group. Rebergen served in that role until he became Secretary-General of the Ministry of Foreign Affairs in July 2024.

== Other activities ==
=== International organizations ===
- Asian Infrastructure Investment Bank (AIIB), Ex-Officio Alternate Member of the Board of Governors (since 2018)
- European Stability Mechanism (ESM), Ex-Officio Member of the Board of Directors (since 2018)
- International Monetary Fund (IMF), Ex-Officio Alternate Member of the Board of Governors (since 2018)

=== Non-profit organizations ===
- PharmAccess Foundation, Member of the Supervisory Board

== Personal life ==
Rebergen is married and has four children.

Civic offices
| Preceded by Hans Vijlbrief | Treasurer-General; 2018–2024 | Succeeded by Jasper Wesseling |
| Preceded by Paul Huijts | Secretary-General of the Ministry of Foreign Affairs; 2024–present | Incumbent |
