= Economic and Financial Committee =

Economic and Financial Committee may refer to:

- United Nations General Assembly Second Committee ("Economic and Financial Committee")
- Economic and Financial Committee (European Union)
- Economic and Financial Affairs Council (Council of the European Union)
