= Ronald Gerritse =

Dutch civil servant

Chair of the Authority for the Financial Markets
- In office 1 May 2011 – 26 September 2013
- Preceded by: Hans Hoogervorst
- Succeeded by: Merel van Vroonhoven

Treasurer-General
- In office 1 January 2008 – 1 May 2011
- Preceded by: Laura van Geest
- Succeeded by: Hans Vijlbrief

Personal details
- Born: Ronald Gerritse; 22 September 1952 Jutphaas, Utrecht
- Died: 26 September 2013 (aged 61) The Hague, South Holland
- Children: 2
- Education: Vrije Universiteit

Ronald Gerritse (22 September 1952 – 26 September 2013) was a Dutch civil servant, who served as the chair of the Authority for the Financial Markets and as Treasurer-General at the Ministry of Finance.

== Education and career ==
Gerritse was born in 1952 in the village Jutphaas in the province Utrecht. He studied economics at the Vrije Universiteit Amsterdam until 1977. He started his career at the Institute for Government Expenditure Research and received his doctor's degree in 1982 while working there. His dissertation was titled "The realm of necessity; an analysis of the industrial business cycle in socialist Czechoslovakia".

Gerritse also worked for the parliamentary inquiry into shipbuilder Rijn-Schelde-Verolme. He left the institute to take a job at the Ministry of Social Affairs and Employment in 1984. Three years later, Gerritse returned to the government expenditure institute to serve as its director. Afterwards, he held the position of general-secretary at the Social and Economic Council.

He was the secretary-general of the Ministry of Social Affairs and Employment between February 1996 and March 2003. Gerritse became the secretary-general of the Ministry of Finance in the latter year. Besides this job, he started serving as Treasurer-General in 2008. In these positions, he was involved in the nationalization of the bank ABN AMRO and the Dutch subsidiary of Fortis during the Great Recession.

Gerritse left the finance ministry in May 2011 to work as the chairman of the Authority for the Financial Markets (AFM). Gerritse died on 26 September 2013 aged 61. His duties had been taken over by a member of the executive board since June, when treatment had started for a disease in Gerritse's bone marrow.

== Personal life ==
Gerritse was married to his wife and had two children.

Civic offices
Preceded by Laura van Geest	Treasurer-General; 2008–2011	Succeeded by Hans Vijlbrief
Preceded by Hans Hoogervorst	Chair of the Authority for the Financial Markets; 2011–2013	Succeeded by Merel van Vroonhoven
