= Hind Dekker-Abdulaziz =

Dutch politician (born 1981)

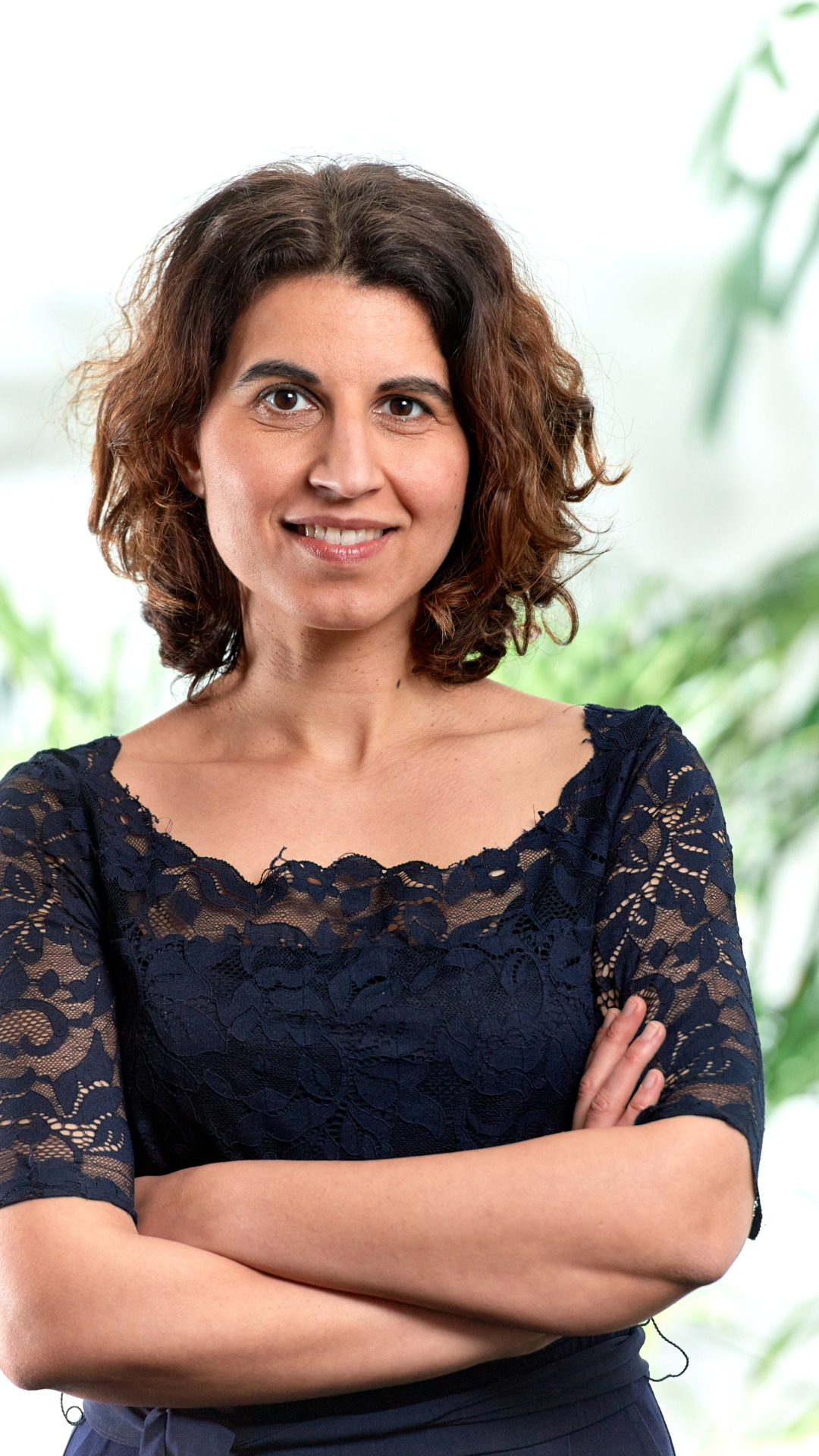
Hind Dekker-Abdulaziz in 2021.

Hind Dekker-Abdulaziz (born 28 September 1981) is an Iraqi-born Dutch politician from Democrats 66.

== Early life ==
Dekker-Abdulaziz was born in Iraq and came to the Netherlands as a refugee from the Gulf War.

== Political career ==
She was a municipal councillor in Utrecht. As a member of the Democrats 66, she was a candidate in the 2021 Dutch general election, but was not elected. On 25 January 2022, she was installed as a member of the House of Representatives to fill the vacancy created by the accession of Hans Vijlbrief to the fourth Rutte cabinet.

== Electoral history ==
Electoral history of Hind Dekker-Abdulaziz
Year	Body	Party	Pos.	Votes	Result		Ref.
Year	Body	Party	Pos.	Votes	Party seats	Individual	Ref.
2021	House of Representatives	Democrats 66	28	7,806	24	Lost (Note: Dekker-Abdulaziz was appointed to the body later during the term due to a vacancy.)	
2023	House of Representatives	Democrats 66	46	580	9	Lost	
