= Eric Wiebes =

Dutch politician

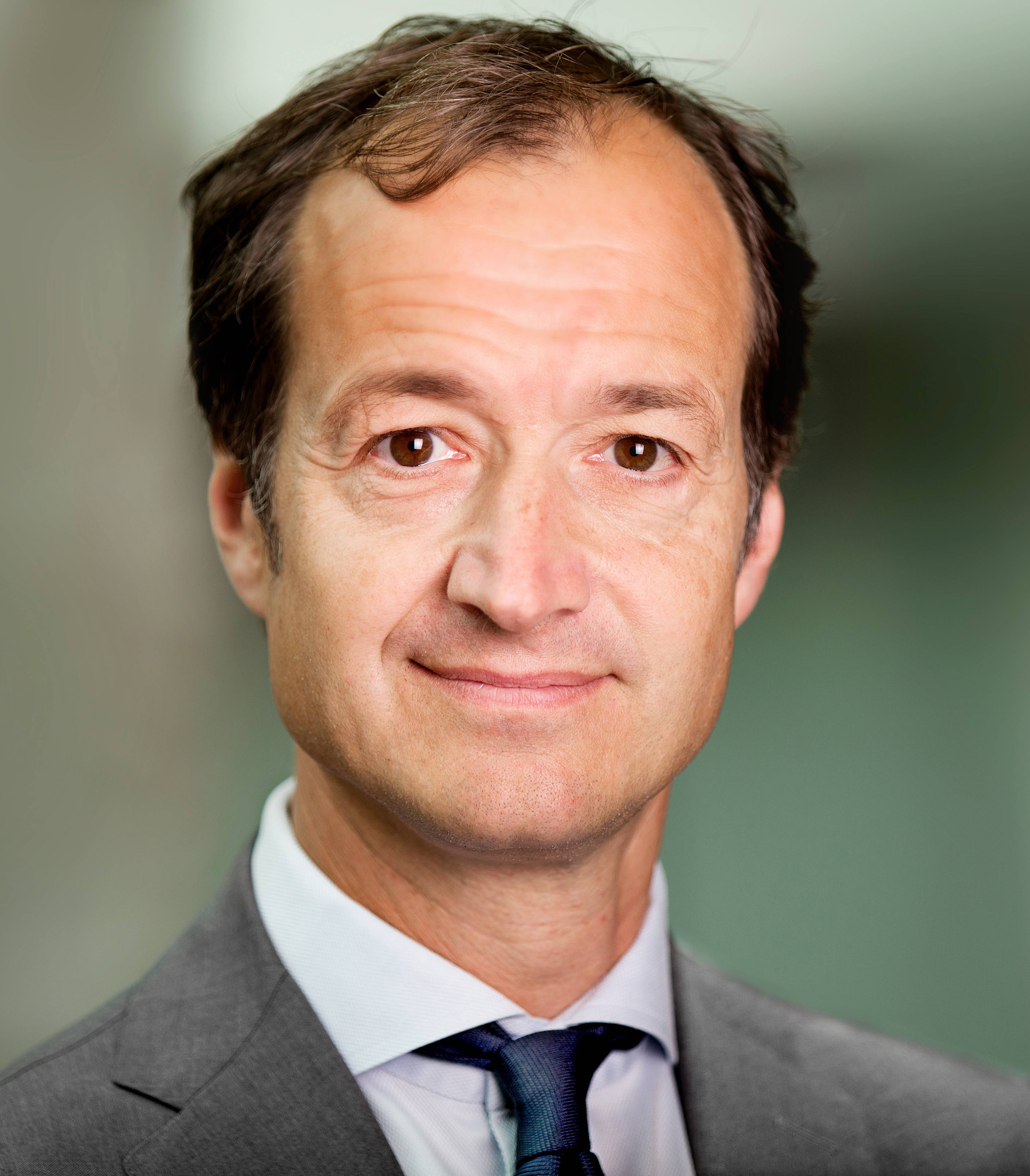
- Wiebes in 2015

Minister of Economic Affairs and Climate Policy
- In office 26 October 2017 – 15 January 2021
- Prime Minister: Mark Rutte
- Preceded by: Henk Kamp
- Succeeded by: Cora van Nieuwenhuizen (Acting)

State Secretary for Finance
- In office 4 February 2014 – 26 October 2017
- Prime Minister: Mark Rutte
- Preceded by: Frans Weekers
- Succeeded by: Menno Snel

Personal details
- Born: Eric Derk Wiebes; 12 March 1963 (age 63) Delft, Netherlands
- Party: People's Party for Freedom and Democracy (since 2005, 1983–1986)
- Spouse: Hester Bijl (m. 1996; div. 2013)
- Children: 2 children
- Education: Delft University of Technology (Bachelor of Engineering, Master of Engineering); INSEAD (Bachelor of Business Administration, Master of Business Administration)
- Occupation: Politician · Civil servant · Management consultant
- Website: Minister of Economic Affairs and Climate Policy

Eric Derk Wiebes (born 12 March 1963) is a Dutch politician who served as Minister of Economic Affairs and Climate Policy in the Third Rutte cabinet since 26 October 2017 until 15 January 2021. He is a member of the People's Party for Freedom and Democracy (VVD).

A management consultant by occupation, he worked for the Royal Dutch Shell from 1987 until 1989, the McKinsey & Company from 1990 until 1992 and for OC&C Strategy Consultants from 1993 until 2004. Wiebes then became a civil servant working for the Ministry of Economic Affairs from 2004 until 2010 when he was appointed as an alderman of Amsterdam serving from 19 May 2010 until 4 February 2014. After the resignation of Frans Weekers as State Secretary for Finance, Wiebes was nominated to succeed him and resigned as alderman. He took office in the Second Rutte cabinet; following the general election of 2017, he was asked to become Minister of Economic Affairs and Climate Policy. He resigned on 15 January 2021.

== Education and private career ==
Wiebes was born in Delft on 12 March 1963 and grew up in Muiderberg. His father, a nuclear physicist, died when he was nine years old. He completed his vwo (secondary education) in nearby Bussum, graduating in 1981. He continued his studies the same year at Delft University of Technology studying mechanical engineering. In 1986 he obtained an engineer's degree, having specialized himself in policy functions concerning government. Wiebes then started working in the private sector, being employed at Shell from April 1987 to January 1990, McKinsey & Company from January 1990 to January 1993, and OC&C Strategy Consultants from January 1993 to April 2004. In 1991 he earned an MBA degree in business administration at INSEAD in Fontainebleau, France. From September 2004 until May 2010 he was employed at the Ministry of Economic Affairs. Until September 2007 he was director of Market mechanism, and the last three years he spent as deputy secretary-general.

== Politics ==
=== Municipality of Amsterdam ===
Wiebes discussed his future career together with Willibrord van Beek, at the time a member of the House of Representatives. Van Beek advised taking up a position as alderman. Wiebes declined two offers from smaller municipalities which he deemed not challenging enough. In 2010, the municipality of Amsterdam was searching for a new alderman from the People's Party for Freedom and Democracy. Eric van der Burg, the local party leader, asked Van Beek if he knew a candidate; Van Beek then advised choosing Wiebes. Prime Minister Mark Rutte put Wiebes name forward as well. Wiebes accepted the offer. As alderman in Amsterdam Wiebes dealt with problematic topics such as the municipal ICT, air quality, construction of the new Noord/Zuidlijn metro-line, and the local taxi-market. Wiebes served as alderman between 19 May 2010 and 4 February 2014.

=== National government ===
On 30 January 2014, Frans Weekers resigned as State Secretary of Finance. As successor to Weekers Wiebes was tasked with solving the problems at the Tax and Customs Administration. He entered office on 4 February. In May 2015, after an investigation of a committee of the European Parliament on a tax deal the Netherlands made with Starbucks, Wiebes stated that the Netherlands was not a tax haven. During his time in office the problems at the Tax and Customs Administration remained, with a departure scheme unexpectedly leading too many experienced personnel to leave the organization. The modernization of the ICT also remained problematic. He was the only politician not to lose his position over the problems.

On 26 October 2017, Wiebes was appointed Minister for Economic Affairs and Climate Policy in the Third Rutte cabinet. During his term in office the extraction of natural gas in the Netherlands was stopped. However, there was criticism of his role in management of problems which were caused by the extraction of gas during decades.

Peter de Waard, a journalist at de Volkskrant described Wiebes as a realist and pragmatist, but also as one who at times makes big statements too easily.

== Personal life ==
Wiebes has two children. He is an atheist.

Political offices
Preceded by Frans Weekers	State Secretary for Finance; 2014–2017	Succeeded by Menno Snel
Preceded by Henk Kamp as Minister of Economic Affairs	Minister of Economic Affairs and Climate Policy; 2017–2021	Succeeded by Cora van Nieuwenhuizen interim
