= Treasurer-General =

In the Netherlands the Treasurer-General (Dutch: thesaurier-generaal) is the head of the General Treasury, part of the Ministry of Finance. The holder of the office has a deputy and is a member of the board of directors of the finance ministry.

== List of recent Treasurers-General ==
Name	Took office	Left office	Term length
Jan-Willem Oosterwijk	July 1, 1997	February 1, 2000	2 years, 215 days
Kees van Dijkhuizen	February 1, 2000	December 1, 2005	5 years, 303 days
Laura van Geest	February 1, 2006	January 1, 2008	1 year, 334 days
Ronald Gerritse	January 1, 2008	May 1, 2011	3 years, 120 days
Hans Vijlbrief	July 1, 2011	February 1, 2018	6 years, 215 days
Christiaan Rebergen	June 1, 2018	August 12, 2024	6 years, 72 days
Jasper Wesseling	August 12, 2024	Incumbent	203 days
