= De Jacht op Meral Ö =

- Directed by: Stijn Bouma
- Written by: Stijn Bouma; Roelof Jan Minneboo
- Produced by: Koji Nelissen; Derk-Jan Warrink
- Starring: Dilan Yurdakul; Gijs Naber; Raymond Thiry
- Cinematography: Mick van Dantzig
- Edited by: Saskia Kievits
- Production company: Kepler Film
- Distributed by: Paradiso Film
- Release date: 2 September 2024 (De Balie)
- Running time: 91 minutes
- Country: Netherlands
- Languages: Dutch; Turkish

De Jacht op Meral Ö is a Dutch drama film from 2024 about the Dutch childcare benefits scandal, directed by Stijn Bouma in his fiction directorial debut. Bouma previously directed two documentaries about the victims of the scandal, Alleen tegen de Staat from 2021 and Sheila versus de Staat from 2023. The film premiered on 2 September 2024 in De Balie in Amsterdam. The film also played at the Film by the Sea film festival in Vlissingen.

== Premise ==
The Turkish-Dutch Meral tries to keep afloat with her two young daughters in Almere when the tax authorities unjustly demand an enormous repayment of €34,000 in child benefits.

== Reception ==
The film received mixed-to-positive reviews from Dutch critics. Trouw called it a compelling drama about the childcare benefits scandal. De Volkskrant gave the film four out of five stars, while Dagblad van het Noorden gave it three stars out of four. Renske Leijten, one of the whistleblowers of the childcare benefits scandal, praised how realistically the film depicted the scandal.
