= Henk Kamp =

Dutch politician (born 1952)

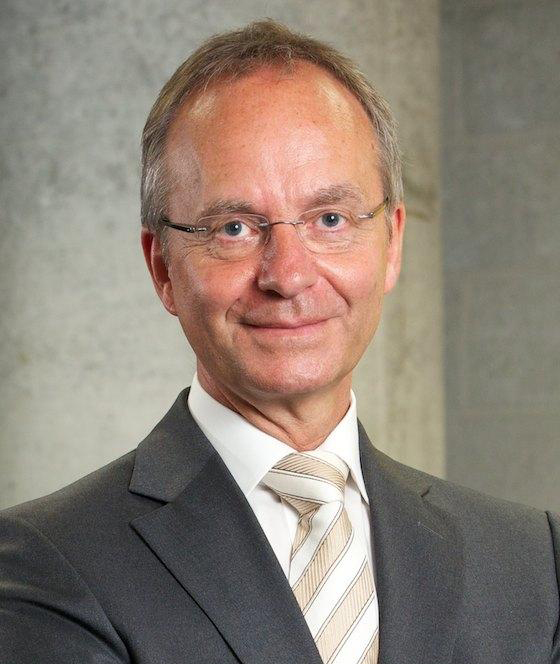
- Kamp in 2011

Minister of Defence
- In office 24 September 2021 – 10 January 2022
- Prime Minister: Mark Rutte
- Preceded by: Ferdinand Grapperhaus
- Succeeded by: Kajsa Ollongren
- In office 12 December 2002 – 22 February 2007
- Prime Minister: Jan Peter Balkenende
- Preceded by: Benk Korthals
- Succeeded by: Eimert van Middelkoop

Minister of Economic Affairs
- In office 5 November 2012 – 26 October 2017
- Prime Minister: Mark Rutte
- Preceded by: Maxime Verhagen
- Succeeded by: Eric Wiebes

Minister of Social Affairs and Employment
- In office 14 October 2010 – 5 November 2012
- Prime Minister: Mark Rutte
- Preceded by: Piet Hein Donner
- Succeeded by: Lodewijk Asscher

Governor-General of the Caribbean Netherlands
- In office 1 January 2009 – 10 October 2010
- Monarch: Beatrix
- Preceded by: Office established
- Succeeded by: Hans Gerritsen

Minister of Housing, Spatial Planning and the Environment
- In office 22 July 2002 – 27 May 2003
- Prime Minister: Jan Peter Balkenende
- Preceded by: Jan Pronk
- Succeeded by: Sybilla Dekker

Member of the House of Representatives
- In office 30 November 2006 – 18 December 2008
- In office 30 January 2003 – 27 May 2003
- In office 17 May 1994 – 22 July 2002
- Parliamentary group: People's Party for Freedom and Democracy

Personal details
- Born: Henricus Gregorius Jozeph Kamp; 23 July 1952 (age 74) Hengelo, Netherlands
- Party: People's Party for Freedom and Democracy (from 1972)
- Spouse: Linda Kamp (m. 1975)
- Children: 1 son and 1 daughter
- Occupation: Politician; civil servant; nonprofit director; trade association executive; salesman; tax collector

Henricus Gregorius Jozeph "Henk" Kamp (Dutch pronunciation: [ɦɛnˈrikʏs xreːˈɣoːrijə ˈɕoːzəf ɦɛŋ ˈkɑmp]; (Note: Gregorius, Jozeph and Henk in isolation: [ɣreːˈɣoːrijəs], [ˈjoːzəf] and [ɦɛŋk].) born 23 July 1952) is a Dutch politician of the People's Party for Freedom and Democracy (VVD) who was Minister of Defence in the Cabinet Rutte III from 24 September 2021 to 10 January 2022. He previously was Minister of Defence in the Cabinets Balkenende I, II and III from 12 December 2002 until 22 February 2007.

Kamp studied Customs at the Civil Service Academy in Utrecht. Kamp worked as a tax collector for the Fiscal Information and Investigation Service (FIOD) of the Tax and Customs Administration from April 1980 until May 1994. After the election of 1994 Kamp was elected as a Member of the House of Representatives on 17 May 1994 and was a frontbencher and spokesperson for Integration. After the election of 2002 Kamp was appointed as Minister of Housing, Spatial Planning and the Environment in the Cabinet Balkenende I taking office on 22 July 2002. The Cabinet Balkenende I fell just 87 days into its term and shortly thereafter was appointed as Minister of Defence following the resignation of Benk Korthals taking office on 12 December 2002. After the election of 2003 Kamp continued as Minister of Defence in the Cabinet Balkenende II. The Cabinet Balkenende fell on 30 June 2006 was replaced with the caretaker Cabinet Balkenende III with Kamp retaining his position. After the election of 2006 Kamp returned to the House of Representatives on 30 November 2006 and was a frontbencher and spokesperson for Kingdom Relations. In December 2008 Kamp was nominated as the first Governor of the Caribbean Netherlands serving from 1 January 2009 until 10 October 2010.

After the election of 2010 Kamp was appointed as Minister of Social Affairs and Employment in the Cabinet Rutte I taking office 14 October 2010. The Cabinet Rutte I fell 18 months into its term and shortly thereafter announced that he would not stand for the election of 2012 but accept to serve in a new cabinet position. After the election Kamp was appointed as Minister of Economic Affairs in the Cabinet Rutte II taking office on 5 November 2012. In February 2016 Kamp announced his retirement and that he wouldn't stand for the election of 2017 and declined to serve in new cabinet.

Kamp retired from active politics at 65 and became active in the private sector, and as a trade association executive serving as Chairman of the Healthcare Providers association since January 2018 and became a Member of the Social and Economic Council for the Industry and Employers confederation (VNO-NCW) in February 2018.

== Early life ==
Henricus Gregorius Jozeph Kamp was born on 23 July 1952 in Hengelo in the Netherlands Province of Overijssel in a Roman Catholic family. He left the Roman Catholic faith years later and became a Humanist. His father died when Kamp was twelve. After completing his HAVO diploma he worked at two wholesalers in Enschede, Borculo and Tilburg until 1977. From 1977 to 1980 he attended the auditors training at the Tax Training in Utrecht. He worked as an investigator for the Fiscal Intelligence and Investigation Service (FIOD) until 1986.

== Politics ==
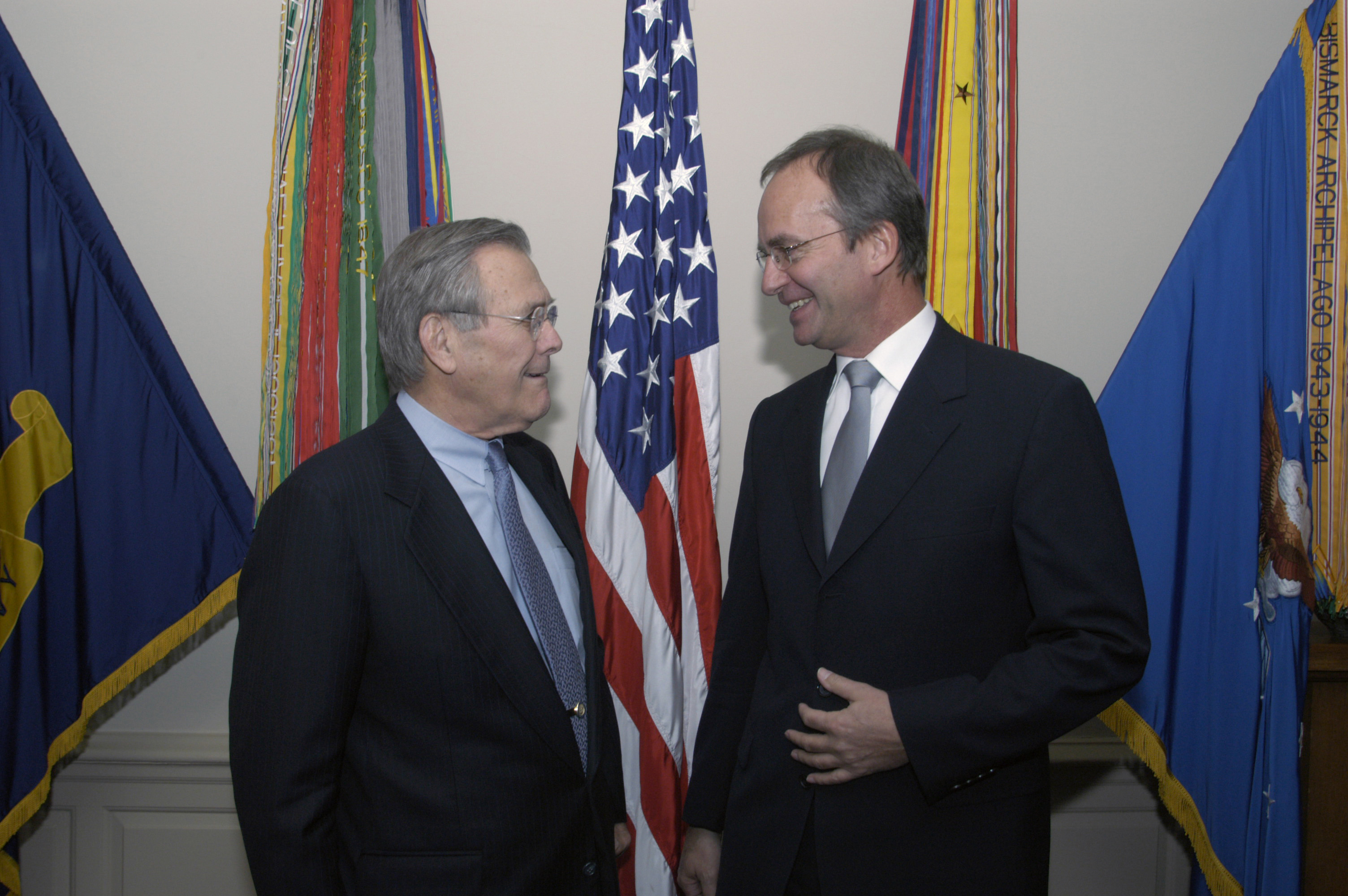
United States Secretary of Defense Donald Rumsfeld and Minister Henk Kamp at The Pentagon on 17 March 2004.

From 1976 to 1994 he was a member of the municipal council in Borculo. From 1986 he was in also alderman in Borculo. From 1987 to 1994 he was a member of the Provincial Council of Gelderland. He became a Member of the House of Representatives on 17 May 1994. On 22 July 2002, Kamp became Minister of Housing, Spatial Planning and the Environment. He was Minister of Defence from December 12, 2002, till 22 February 2007. After early elections were held as a result of parliamentary agreements following the formation of the minority cabinet Balkenende III. As part of his "farewell tour" as Minister of Defence, Henk Kamp visited the Dutch troops in Afghanistan and paid his respects to president Hamid Karzai. President Karzai awarded Henk Kamp the High State Medal of Ghazi Wazir Mohammad Akbar Khan. Kamp left the House of Representatives on 1 January 2009 to head the transformation of Bonaire, Saba and St. Eustatius to special municipalities within the Netherlands.

On 13 September 2012, the day after the parliamentary elections, Kamp was asked to prepare for the formation of a new cabinet and had exploratory conversations with several parties. Already on that very day the Parliamentary leaders in the House of Representatives met with the President of the House of Representatives Gerdi Verbeet. His opinion after the talks was to start a formation on a coalition with the People's Party for Freedom and Democracy and the Labour Party with himself and former Leader of the Labour Party Wouter Bos as informateurs. The formation resulted in the forming of the Cabinet Rutte II and Kamp became Minister of Economic Affairs and took office on 5 November 2012. After the resignation of Minister of Security and Justice Ivo Opstelten on 10 March 2015, Kamp became the senior member of the Council of Ministers and the third highest-ranking member after Prime Minister Mark Rutte and Deputy Prime Minister Lodewijk Asscher.

Early February 2016 Kamp announced his retirement from national politics as of the 2017 elections. He has since been a columnist for de Volkskrant. As of 2024, he lived with his wife, Linda Kamp, in the former orangery of the Nijenhuis estate in Diepenheim.

== Decorations ==
Honours
Ribbon bar	Honour	Country	Date	Comment
	Grand Cross of the Order of Leopold II	Belgium	15 April 2006	
	Grand Officer of the Order of the Oak Crown	Luxembourg	25 December 2012	
	Knight Commander of the Order of Merit	Germany	12 September 2013	
	1st Class, Grand Cordon of the Order of the Rising Sun	Japan	24 October 2014	
	Commander of the Order of Orange-Nassau	Netherlands	14 February 2018	Elevated from Officer (11 April 2007)

== Notes ==
Political offices
Preceded by Jan Pronk	Minister of Housing, Spatial; Planning and the Environment; 2002–2003	Succeeded by Sybilla Dekker
Preceded by Benk Korthals	Minister of Defence; 2003–2007	Succeeded by Eimert van Middelkoop
New office	Governor of the Caribbean Netherlands; 2009–2010	Succeeded by Hans Gerritsen
Preceded by Piet Hein Donner	Minister of Social Affairs and Employment; 2010–2012	Succeeded by Lodewijk Asscher
Preceded by Maxime Verhagen as Minister of Economic Affairs, Agriculture and Innovation	Minister of Economic Affairs; 2012–2017	Succeeded by Eric Wiebes as Minister of Economic Affairs and Climate Policy
Business positions
Preceded by Paul te Riele	Chairman of the Supervisory board of the Twente Hospital Group; 2017–present	Incumbent
Preceded by Guus van Montfort	Chairman of the Executive Board of the Nursing and Home-care association 2018–present	Incumbent
