= Tuomas Saarenheimo =

Finnish civil servant and President of the Eurogroup Working Group

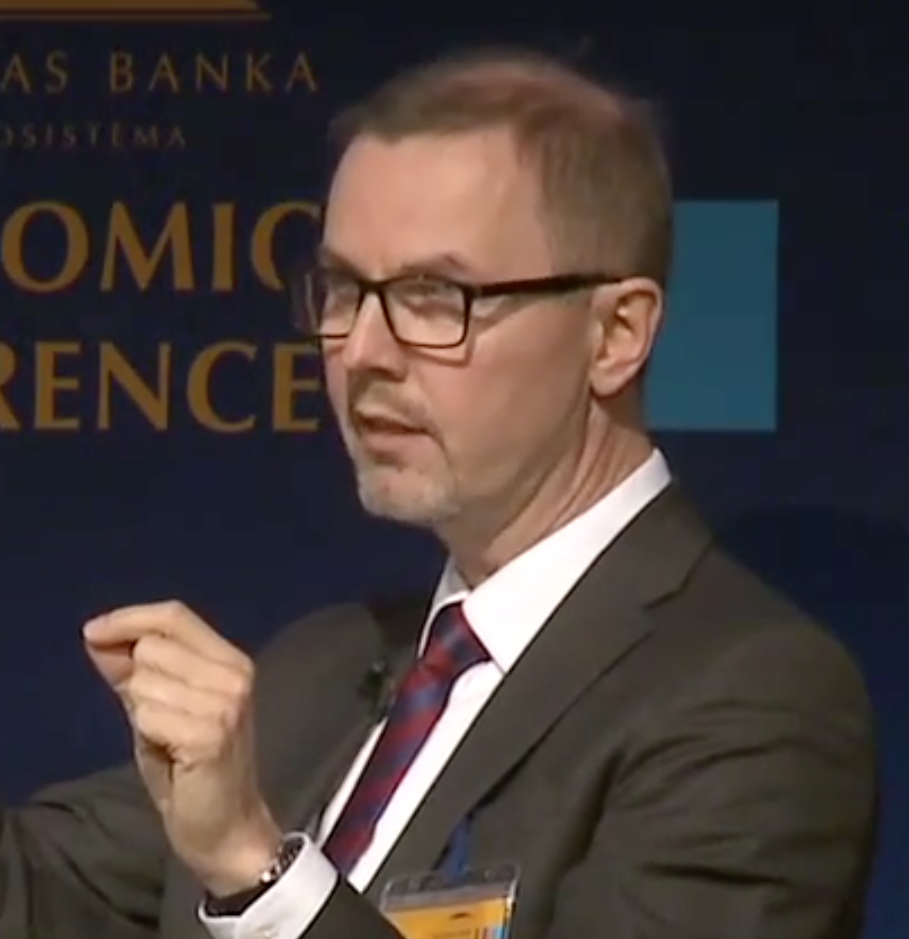
- Saarenheimo in 2015

President of the Eurogroup Working Group
- Incumbent
- Assumed office 1 April 2020
- Preceded by: Hans Vijlbrief

Personal details
- Born: 1964 (age 61–62) Helsinki, Finland
- Spouse: Mari Koli
- Education: University of Helsinki

Tuomas Saarenheimo (born 1964) is a Finnish civil servant, who currently serves as the President of the Eurogroup Working Group.

== Education and career ==
Saarenheimo graduated from the University of Helsinki in 1989 and continued studying afterwards, receiving his doctorate in economics in 1994. He has also worked as a researcher at the university. Saarenheimo filled several positions at the Bank of Finland. His last post was as Chief Adviser and Head of the Monetary and Research Policy Department. Besides, he has served as the Executive Director for Nordic and Baltic countries at the International Monetary Fund and as National Expert at the European Commission.

Saarenheimo became the Permanent Under-Secretary for International and Financial Market Affairs at the Ministry of Finance in September 2013. Because of this position, he was granted membership of the Eurogroup Working Group, an advisory body that prepares the monthly meetings of the Eurogroup. He also became a member of the board of directors of the European Financial Stability Facility, the eurozone's emergency fund to address government debt.

On 1 April 2020 he became President of the Eurogroup Working Group (EWG) after his predecessor Hans Vijlbrief had resigned in order to fill a cabinet position in the Netherlands. Saarenheimo had been elected by the EWG in February, and that decision was later ratified by the Eurogroup. He simultaneously became President of the Economic and Financial Committee. Saarenheimo had been a candidate for EWG president before in 2018, but withdrew.

Diplomatic posts
Preceded by Hans Vijlbrief	President of the Eurogroup Working Group; 2020–present	Incumbent
