= Alexandra van Huffelen =

Dutch politician (born 1968)

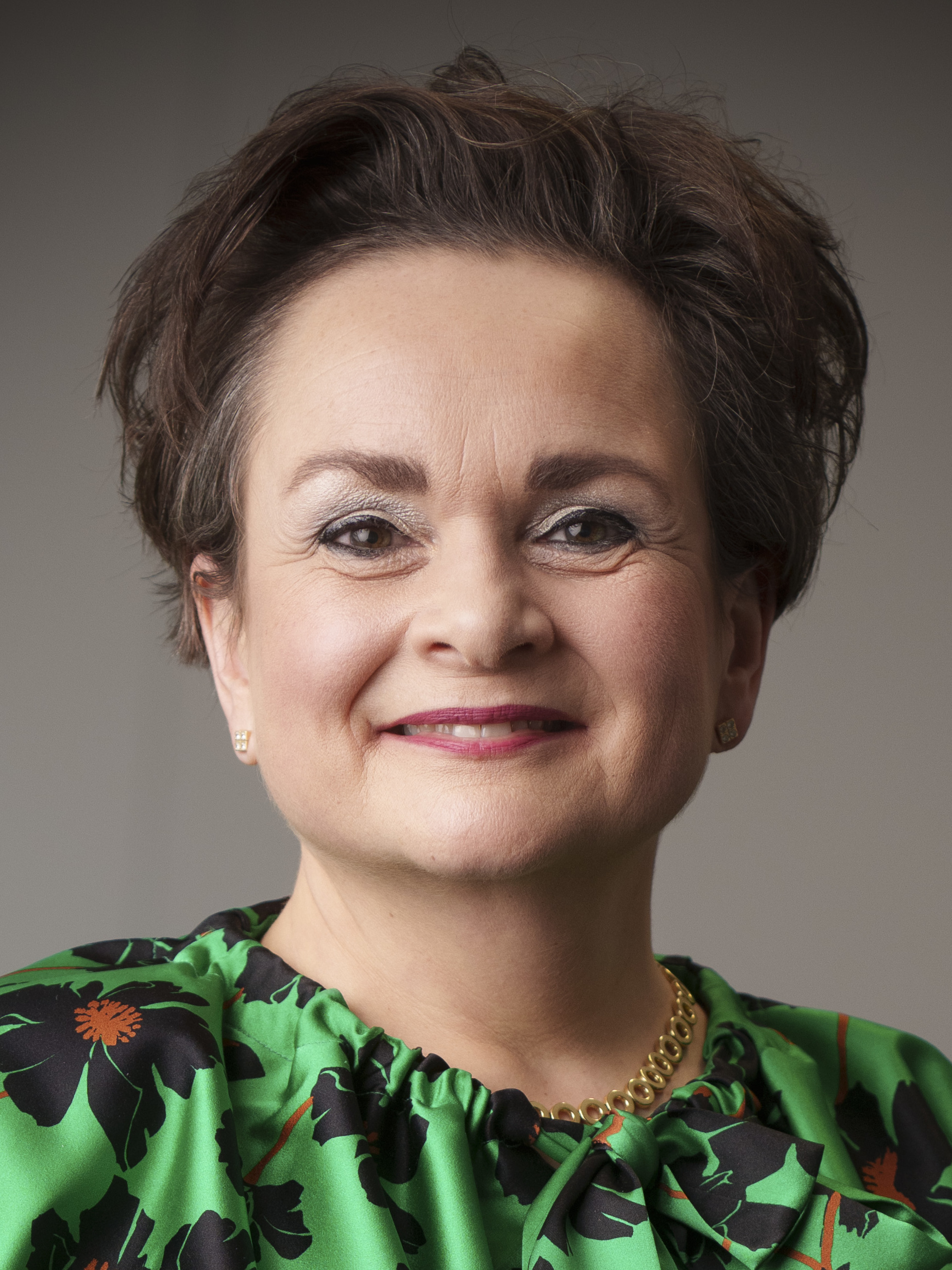
- Van Huffelen in 2022

Chairperson of Democrats 66
- Incumbent
- Assumed office 23 November 2024
- Preceded by: Victor Everhardt

State Secretary for Kingdom Relations and Digitalisation
- In office 10 January 2022 – 2 July 2024
- Prime Minister: Mark Rutte
- Preceded by: Raymond Knops
- Succeeded by: Zsolt Szabó

State Secretary for Finance
- In office 29 January 2020 – 10 January 2022 Serving with Hans Vijlbrief
- Prime Minister: Mark Rutte
- Preceded by: Menno Snel
- Succeeded by: Marnix van Rij; Aukje de Vries

Member of the Senate
- In office 11 June 2019 – 29 January 2020

Personal details
- Born: Alexandra Carla van Huffelen; 21 July 1968 (age 58) Leiden, Netherlands
- Party: Democrats 66 (from 1989)
- Education: Leiden University (Bachelor of Public Administration); Erasmus University Rotterdam (Master of Public Administration)
- Occupation: Politician · civil servant · Management consultant
- Website: State Secretary for Finance

Alexandra Carla van Huffelen (born 21 July 1968) is a Dutch politician of the Democrats 66 (D66) party. She served in the third and fourth Rutte cabinets, and she became party chair in November 2024.

== Early life and career ==
Van Huffelen was born in 1968, and her father was a clinical neurophysiology professor. She studied public administration at Leiden University and Erasmus University Rotterdam, and she began her career at the Ministry of Housing, Spatial Planning and the Environment. She started working for energy company Essent in 2000, eventually serving as sustainable energy director. Following a drop in employee rationale, an internal evaluation pointed to her leadership style as the cause. Van Huffelen later stated that she had learned from the experience, and she acknowledged having exerted excessive pressure to achieve cost reductions.

In 2010, she was appointed alderwoman in Rotterdam, responsible for sustainability. She served on behalf of D66, which she had joined in 1989. Van Huffelen was a proponent of urban agriculture, and she advocated for green roofs and narrow strips of plants along façades. She ran for party chair of D66 in 2013, but she narrowly lost the member election. She has served as chair of the D66's fundraising committee and as treasurer of the party's Rotterdam chapter. In 2014, she became managing director of GVB, Amsterdam's public transport operator, where she was tasked with absorbing a €65 million reduction in government subsidies over ten years. The organization prioritized its busiest and most profitable lines, with the newly opened North–South Line playing an important role. Less busy stops and bus and tram lines were discontinued. Alongside her role at GVB, Van Huffelen started serving as a member of the Senate in June 2019.

She became State Secretary for Finance in the third Rutte cabinet on 29 January 2020, where she worked to compensate victims of the childcare benefits scandal. Under Van Huffelen's leadership, victims received €30,000 payments to ease the compensation procedure's backlog; however, the number of applicants for the procedure increased. Her position changed to State Secretary for Kingdom Relations and Digitalisation on 10 January 2022 when the fourth Rutte cabinet was formed. Van Huffelen's term as state secretary ended on 2 July 2024, when the Schoof cabinet was sworn in. She announced her candidacy for party chair of D66 in September 2024 following the stepping down of Victor Everhardt. Van Huffelen was elected to the position with 65% of the vote, and she assumed office on 23 November 2024. Besides, she is planned to succeed Daniël Wigboldus as president of the executive board of Radboud University Nijmegen in February 2025.

== Personal life ==
Van Huffelen's husband works as a notary. As of 2024, they lived in the center of Utrecht.

== Electoral history ==
Electoral history of Alexandra van Huffelen
Year	Body	Party	Pos.	Votes	Result		Ref.
Year	Body	Party	Pos.	Votes	Party seats	Individual	Ref.
2023	House of Representatives	Democrats 66	73 (Note: Van Huffelen participated as a lijstduwer.)	1,119	9	Lost	
2024	European Parliament	Democrats 66	33	3,760	3	Lost	

== Notes ==
Political offices
Preceded by Menno Snel	State Secretary for Finance; 2020-2022; Served alongside: Hans Vijlbrief	Succeeded by Aukje de Vries
Preceded by Raymond Knops	State Secretary for Kingdom Relations and Digitalisation; 2022-2024	Succeeded by Zsolt Szabó
Party political offices
Preceded by Victor Everhardt	Chairperson of Democrats 66; 2024–present	Incumbent
