= Thomas Wieser =

Austrian economist

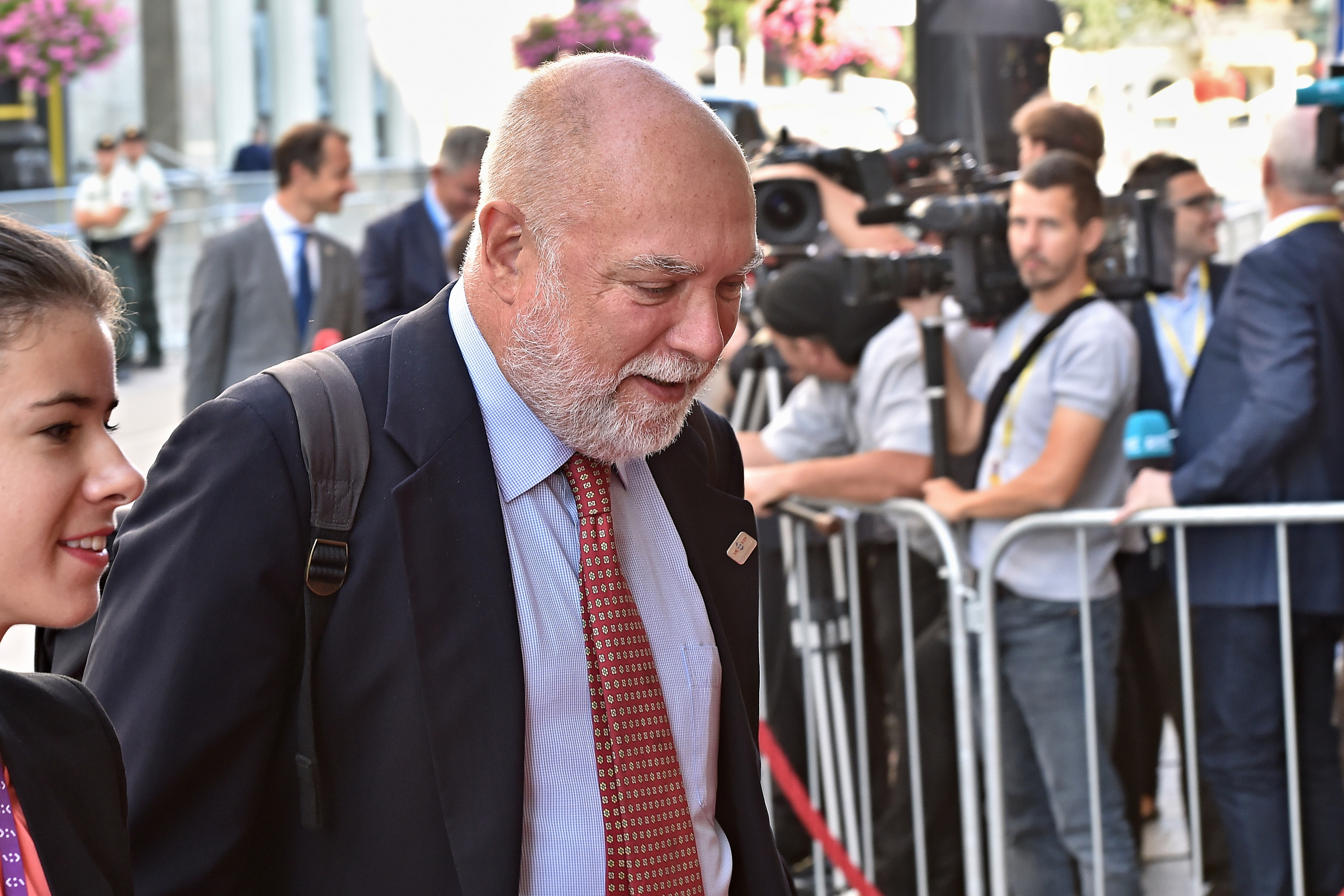

Personal details
- Born: 1954 (age 71–72) Bethesda, Maryland, U.S.
- Education: University of Innsbruck; University of Colorado, Boulder

Thomas Wieser (born 1954) is an American-Austrian economist working for the European Union. He was the president of Economic and Financial Committee (EFC) of the EU as well as the president of the Eurogroup Working Group (EWG), both advisory bodies of the Eurogroup, until February 2018.

== Political career ==
Between 2005 and 2009, Wieser chaired the OECD Committee on Financial Markets. Wieser became Vice-President of Economic and Financial Committee of the European Union (EFC) in November 2005. He went on to serve his first term as the president of the committee from March 2009 to March 2011.

Prior to October 2011, Wieser was Director General for Economic Policy and Financial Markets in the Ministry of Finance, Austria. In October 2011, Wieser became the full time president of the Eurogroup Working Group (EWG), an advisory body to the Eurogroup. In January 2012, Wieser started his second term as the president of the EFC of the European Union, he retain presidency of the EWG.

Explaining his negotiating role Wieser has stated:

I am something like a marriage counsellor who tries – between two or several partners, if one accepts polygamy – to achieve a common understanding of things and seeks to make sure that perational implementation gets underway

The EFC/EWG prepares Economic and Financial Affairs Council (ECOFIN) decisions particularly on eurozone affairs, as the informal eurozone bodies were gradually given more official roles. In 2014, Wieser stated that Europe was having an economic recovery but competitiveness should be strengthened, bank balance sheets should be improved and fiscal deficits reduced.

In 2019, Wieser chaired a “High-Level Group of Wise Persons” appointed by the Council of the European Union and charged with drafting recommendations on how to reform existing financial instruments for sustainable development managed by the European Commission, the European Investment Bank (EIB) and the European Bank for Reconstruction and Development (EBRD).

== Other activities ==
- Centre d'Etudes Prospectives et d'Informations Internationales (CEPII), Member of the Board
- GLOBSEC, Member of the International Advisory Council

== Notable commentary ==
Former Greek minister of finance Yanis Varoufakis has claimed that Wieser holds considerable power within the Eurogroup, stating he "has been part of every policy and every coup that resulted in Greece’s immolation and Europe’s ignominy." Sven Giegold, MEP of the German Green Party, has stated in his correspondence with Varoufakis that Wieser "is acting under the auspices of representatives of all finance ministries in the Eurozone which form the Eurozone Working Group. [sic]"

Reflecting on the actions of the Troika in an interview with German journalists, Wieser blamed an excessively high minimum wage in Greece for the decrease in employment in the exporting sector.

== See also ==
- Wolfgang Schäuble
