= Eurogroup Working Group =

Advisory body to the European Union Eurogroup

Eurogroup Working Group (EWG) is an advisory body to the Eurogroup of the European Union. It is composed of representatives of the euro area member states of the Economic and Financial Committee (EFC), the European Commission and the European Central Bank. The President of the Eurogroup Working Group is Tuomas Saarenheimo, who entered the job in April 2020 and is also the President of the EFC. Previously, the posts had been held by Hans Vijlbrief and Thomas Wieser.

Formally the Eurogroup Working Group is a formation or a sub-group of the EFC. Gradually, the EWG "became a key venue for policy debates, reflecting the rise of the Eurogroup as the leading coordination forum of the euro area".
