= Economic and Financial Committee (European Union) =

Advisory body of the European Union

The Economic and Financial Committee (EFC) is a European Union advisory body, defined by the article 134 of the Treaty on the Functioning of the European Union. Its president is also the president of the Eurogroup Working Group, which prepares dossiers for approval by the Eurogroup, whose decisions are generally ratified by ECOFIN.

== History ==
Prior to the third stage of the Economic and Monetary Union (EMU) which began on 1 January 1999, the Economic and Financial Committee was preceded by the Monetary Committee, which was established by article 105 of the Treaty of Rome in 1957.

In May, as part of the European Semester 2016 Spring Package, the committee was tasked with making Article 126(3) reports on Belgium, Finland and Italy's government debt.

== Agenda and composition of the EFC ==
The EFC is an advisory body, set up to promote coordination of member states' policies necessary for the functioning of the internal market. The EFC:

- provides opinions at the request of the council or the European Commission, or on its own initiative
- provides the framework for the dialogue between the Council and the European Central Bank
- contributes to the preparation of the council's work, i.e.:
  - assesses the economic and financial situation in the member states and reports on it regularly to the Council and the Commission
  - provides input on coordination of economic and fiscal policies
  - provides contributions on financial market matters, exchange rate policies and relations with third countries and international institutions

The EFC is composed of senior officials from national administrations and EU central banks, the European Central Bank and the commission. It meets in two different configurations: with or without national central banks.

The EFC also meets in a euro area configuration: the Eurogroup Working Group (EWG), in which only the euro area countries, the Commission and the European Central Bank are represented. In this configuration, the Committee prepares the work of the Eurogroup.

== Previous personnel ==
=== Presidents ===
- Tuomas Saarenheimo (from April 2020)
- Hans Vijlbrief (2018 – 2020)
- Thomas Wieser (2012 – 2018)
- Vittorio Grilli (March 2011 – January 2012)
- Thomas Wieser (March 2009 – March 2011)
- Xavier Musca (November 2005 – February 2009)
- Caio Koch-Weser (May 2003 – November 2005)
- Johnny Åkerholm (October 2001 – May 2003)
- Mario Draghi (June 2000 – September 2001)
- Jean Lemierre (January 1999 -June 2000)

=== Vice-Presidents ===
- Alessandro Rivera (September 2021 – present)
- Carlos San Basilio Pardo (November 2020 – August 2021)
- Odile Renaud-Basso (June 2018 – October 2020)
- Vincenzo La Via (2015 – 2016)
- Vazil Hudak (September 2014 – June 2015)
- Inigo Fernandez De Mesa Vargas (March – September 2014)
- Georges Heinrich (March 2011 – February 2014)
- Vittorio Grilli (March 2009 – March 2011)
- Thomas Wieser (November 2005 – March 2009)
- Kees van Dijkhuizen (May 2005 – November 2005)
- Lorenzo Bini Smaghi (April 2003 – May 2005)
- Caio Koch-Weser (October 2001 – April 2003)
- Johnny Åkerholm (February 1999 – October 2001)
