= Tax and Customs Administration =

Tax collection and customs agency of the Netherlands

- Belastingdienst

Agency overview
- Type: Revenue service
- Jurisdiction: Government of the Netherlands
- Employees: 28,000 (2024)
- Parent department: Ministry of Finance
- Website: belastingdienst.nl

The Tax and Customs Administration (Dutch: Belastingdienst, lit. 'Tax Service') is the tax collection agency of the Kingdom of the Netherlands, operating under the Ministry of Finance. It's responsible for levying and collecting taxes, enforcing tax legislation, and investigating tax fraud.

Additionally, the Tax and Customs Administration contains the Fiscal Information and Investigation Service (FIOD), specializing in tax evasion, money laundering, and other forms of fiscal fraud. Until 2020, it also administered customs duties and oversaw Toeslagen, which distributed income-related social benefits. These responsibilities have since been transferred to separate agencies named Douane and Dienst Toeslagen, respectively.

In 2024, it reported that tax compliance was high with a compliance deficit of 0.4% (missed tax revenue due to incorrect declarations), tax morale and trust in tax authorities scored more than 3 out of 5, and timely tax declaration and payment was made by over 90% of individuals.

Established as an organization in 1805, the Tax and Customs Administration operates under the political oversight of the Minister of Finance.

In addition to the government tax service, there are other tax authorities, these are the municipal, provincial, and water board tax authorities. These entities are responsible for levying and collecting local taxes, which include waste, water, property taxes, and others.

== Role ==
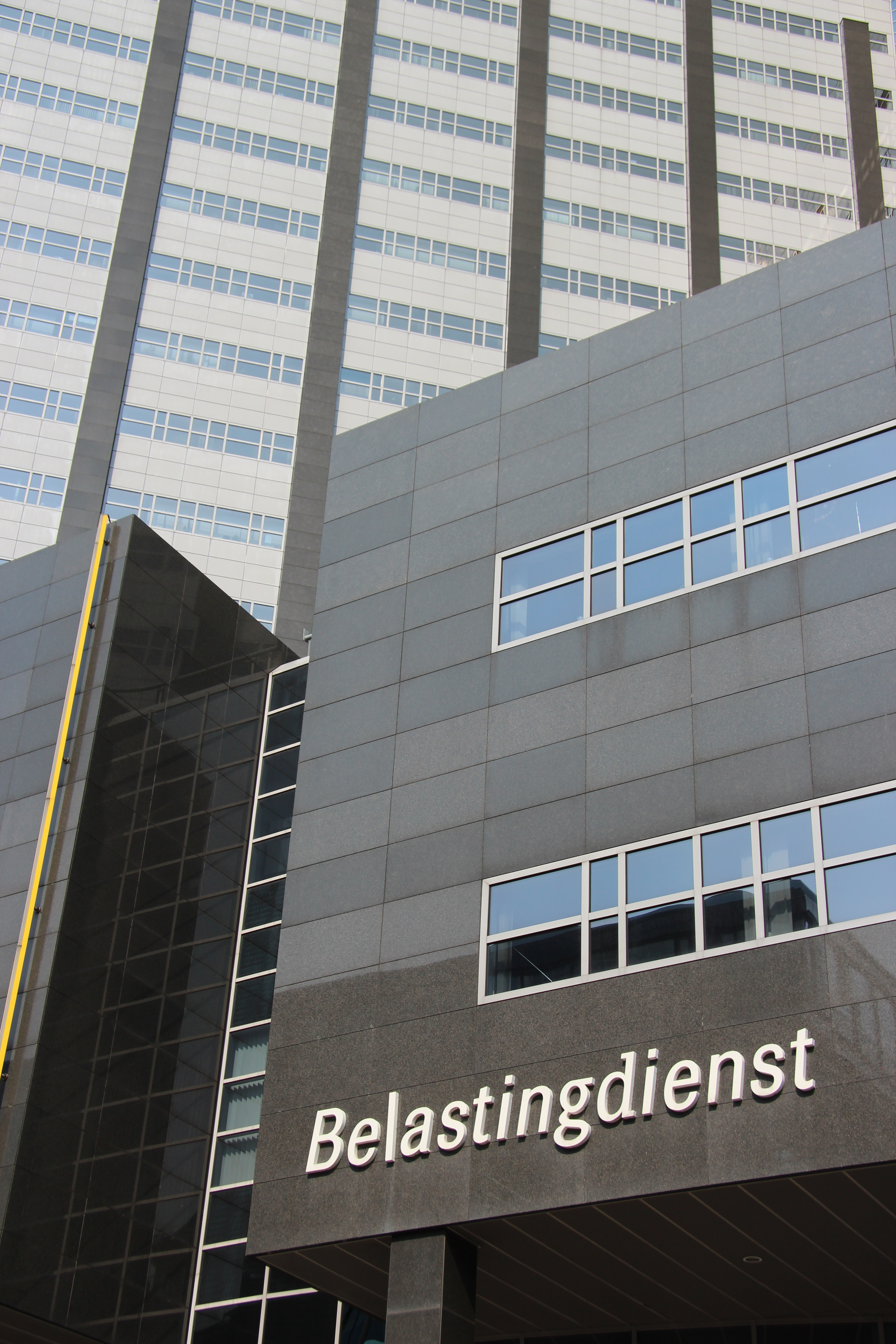
Tax and Customs Administration building, Amsterdam

The Tax and Customs Administration is primarily responsible for levying and collecting taxes in the Netherlands and Dutch Caribbean to generate revenue for the government. It oversees both direct taxes, which include income, dividend, gift and inheritance tax, as well as indirect taxes like value added tax, corporate tax, car tax and environmental taxes. The income generated from these taxes supports funding for public services such as healthcare, education, infrastructure, social benefits and subsidies.

== Organisation ==
The Tax and Customs Administration is part of the Ministry of Finance and consists of seven primary organisational units: Particulieren (Individuals), Midden- en kleinbedrijf (Small and medium-sized enterprises), Grote ondernemingen (Large companies), Centrale Administratieve processen (Central Administrative processes), Klantinteractie en Services (Customer interaction and Services), Informatievoorziening (Provision of information), and Fiscale inlichtingen- en opsporingsdienst (Fiscal Information and Investigation Service).

The Director-General (DG) is Peter Smink and the Deputy Director-General (pDG) is Sezen Bag.

== See also ==
- Dutch childcare benefits scandal
