= Ministry of Finance (Netherlands) =

Government ministry of the Netherlands

- Dutch: Ministerie van Financiën
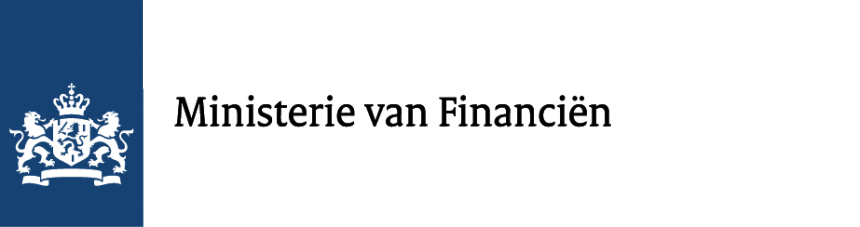
- Logo of the Ministry of Finance

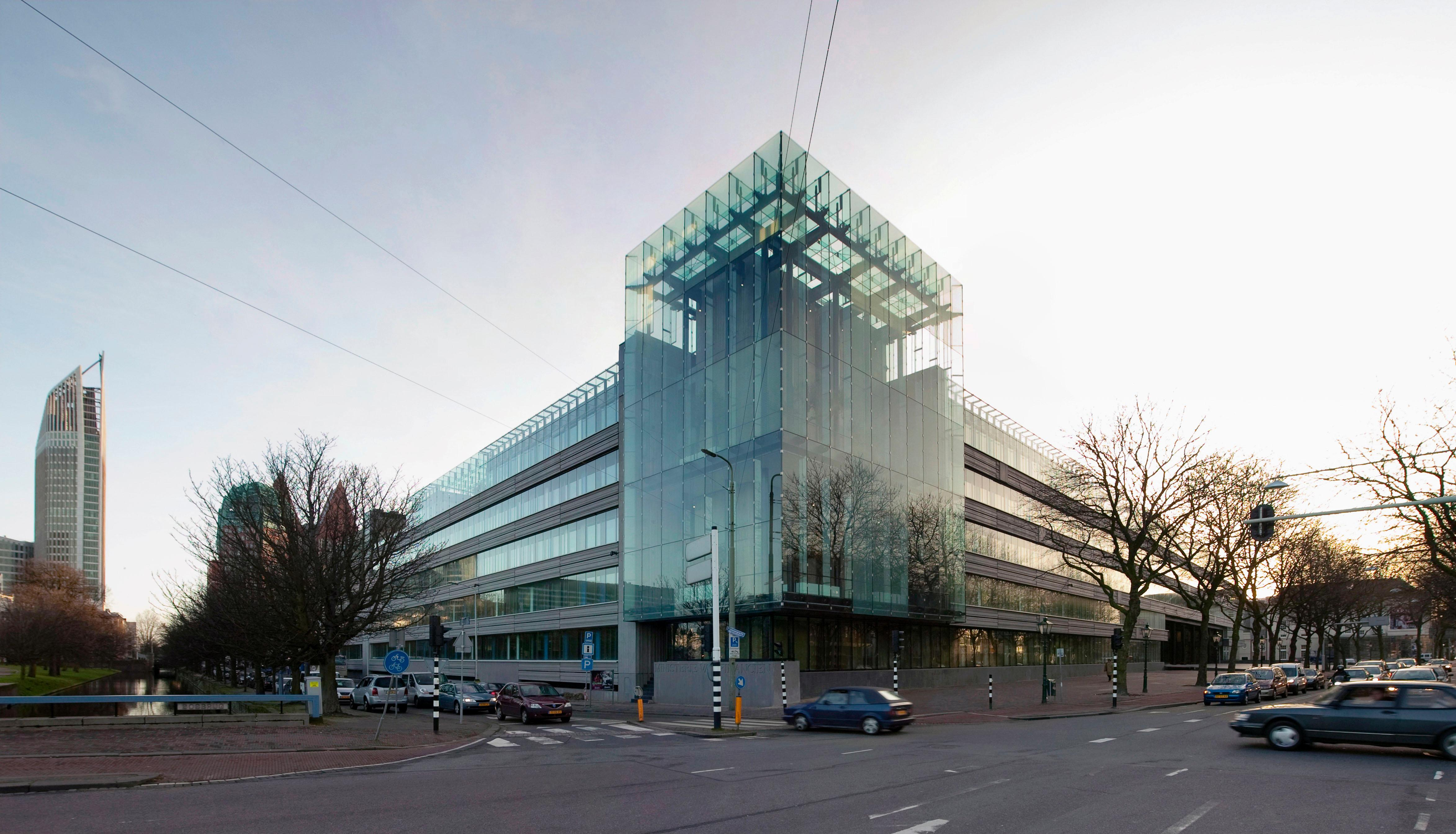
- Building of the Ministry of Finance

Department overview
- Formed: 12 March 1798; 228 years ago
- Jurisdiction: Kingdom of the Netherlands
- Headquarters: Korte Voorhout 7, The Hague, Netherlands
- Employees: 1,500
- Annual budget: €11.7 billion (2013)
- Minister responsible: Eelco Heinen, Minister of Finance
- Deputy Ministers responsible: Eelco Eerenberg, State Secretary for Tax Affairs; Sandra Palmen, State Secretary for Benefits Redress
- Department executive: Manon Leijten, Secretary-General
- Website: Ministry of Finance

The Ministry of Finance (Dutch: Ministerie van Financiën; FIN) is the Dutch Ministry responsible for economic policy, monetary policy, fiscal policy, tax policy, incomes policy, financial regulation, the government budget and the financial market. The Ministry was created in 1798 as the Department of Finance of the Batavian Republic. It became the Ministry of Finance in 1876. The Minister of Finance (Dutch: Minister van Financiën) is the head of the Ministry and a member of the Cabinet of the Netherlands. The current Minister is Eelco Heinen.

== History ==
The ministry was founded in 1798. In the early history of the ministry, the Prime Minister often served as Minister of Finance. Pieter Philip van Bosse served as Minister of Finance five times. Since 1965 a State Secretary has been appointed each formation with responsibility for taxation. The most recent Prime Minister to serve as his own Minister of Finance was Jelle Zijlstra (1966–67).

== Responsibilities ==
The ministry has the duty to "guard the treasury and aim for a financially sound and prosperous state of the Netherlands.

- It is responsible for the income and expenditure of the Kingdom of the Netherlands.
- It collects the taxes and develops fiscal legislation.
- It seeks to expend the budget of the government responsibly, efficiently and effectively.
- It is also responsible for financial-economic policy.
- It supervises the financial markets, banks and financial transfers.

== Organisation ==
The ministry is currently headed by one minister and two State Secretaries. The ministry's main office is located in the centre of The Hague at the Korte Voorhout. It employs almost 1,500 civil servants. The civil service is headed by a secretary general and a deputy secretary general, who head a system of four directorates general:

- General Treasury (financial economic policy), led by the Treasurer-General
  - Agency of the General Treasury
  - Directorate Financing
  - Directorate Financial Markets
  - Directorate Foreign Financial Relations
- Directorate General for the Budget
  - Directorate Budget Affairs
  - Inspection of National Finances
- Directorate General for Fiscal Affairs
  - Directorate General Fiscal Policy
  - Directorate Taxation Management
  - Directorate International Affairs and Excise Tax
- Directorate General for Taxation

It is also responsible for several decentralized services:

- The agency in Amsterdam
- The Tax and Customs Administration, the Dutch revenue service, which includes the customs service and the fiscal policy
- Service for State Property
- Netherlands Authority for the Financial Markets (AFM)

== Holdings ==
A list of all companies (partially owned) by the Dutch government via the Ministry of Finance.

=== State holdings ===
List of companies of which the Ministry of Finance acts merely as shareholder.

Company (abbreviation)	Share	Sector	Country of operation
Holland Casino N.V.	100%	Gambling	Netherlands
Invest-NL N.V.	100%	Finance	Netherlands
De Nederlandse Investeringsbank voor Ontwikkelingslanden N.V.	100%	Finance	Netherlands
SRH N.V.	100%	Finance	Netherlands
Centrale Organisatie Voor Radioactief Afval (COVRA)	100%	Nuclear waste management	Netherlands
Nederlandse Gasunie N.V. (Gasunie)	100%	Energy	Netherlands; Germany
TenneT Holding B.V.	100%	Energy	Netherlands; Germany
Ultra Centrifuge Nederland N.V. (UCN)	100%	Energy	Netherlands; United Kingdom
Nederlandse Spoorwegen N.V. (NS)	100%	Transport	Netherlands; United Kingdom; Germany
Nederlandse Loterij B.V.	99%	Gambling	Netherlands
Luchthaven Schiphol N.V.	69,77%	Infrastructure	NetherlandsFrance; United States; Australia
Nederlandse Financierings-Maatschappij Voor Ontwikkelingslanden N.V. (FMO)	51%	Finance	Netherlands
BNG Bank	50%	Finance	Netherlands
Havenbedrijf Rotterdam N.V.	29,2%	Infrastructure	Netherlands; Brazil; Oman; Indonesia
Nederlandse Waterschapsbank N.V. (NWB Bank)	17,2%	Finance	Netherlands
Air France-KLM	14%	Transport	Netherlands; France
KLM	5,92%	Transport	Netherlands
Thales Nederland	1%	Defence	Netherlands

=== Policy holdings ===
List of policy holdings in which the role of shareholder and policy maker cannot be unbundled from each other. These companies are (partially) owned by the Ministry of Finance and managed by the relevant ministry.

Company	Share	Sector	Ministry	
ProRail B.V.	100%	Infrastructure	Ministry of Infrastructure and Water Management	Netherlands
De Nederlandsche Bank (DNB)	100%	Finance	Ministry of Finance	Netherlands
EBN B.V.	100%	Energy	Ministry of Economic Affairs and Climate Policy	Netherlands
Saba Statia Cable System B.V. (SSCS)	100%	Communication	Ministry of the Interior and Kingdom Relations	Saba
Ontwikkelingsmaatschappij oost Nederland N.V. (Oost NL)	54,6%	Private equity	Ministry of Economic Affairs and Climate Policy	Netherlands
Industriebank Limburgs Instituut voor Ontwikkeling en Financiering N.V. (LIOF)	50%	Private equity	Ministry of Economic Affairs and Climate Policy	Netherlands
Noord-Nederlandse Investerings- en Ontwikkelingsmaatschappij N.V. (NOM)	50%	Private equity	Ministry of Economic Affairs and Climate Policy	Netherlands
Brabantse Ontwikkelings Maatschappij (BOM)	49,9%	Private equity	Ministry of Economic Affairs and Climate Policy	Netherlands
Investeringsfonds Zeeland B.V.	47,3%	Private equity	Ministry of Economic Affairs and Climate Policy	Netherlands
Innovation Quarter B.V.	40,2%	Private equity	Ministry of Economic Affairs and Climate Policy	Netherlands
GasTerra B.V.	10%	Energy	Ministry of Economic Affairs and Climate Policy	Netherlands
Dutch Caribbean Air Navigation Service Provider (DC-ANSP)	7,95%	Infrastructure	Ministry of Infrastructure and Water Management	Curaçao
Winair	7,95%	Transport	Ministry of Infrastructure and Water Management	Sint Maarten
Saba Bank Resources N.V. (Saba Bank)	2,8%	Energy	Ministry of Economic Affairs and Climate Policy	Saba

=== Temporarily financial institutions ===
NLFI is the shareholder on behalf of the Dutch Government in the financial institutions that are state-owned as a result of the 2008 financial crisis.

Company	Share	Sector	Country of operation
Stichting administratiekantoor beheer financiële instellingen / NL Financial Investments (NLFI)	100%	Finance	Netherlands
ABN AMRO Bank N.V.	56%	Finance	Netherlands
Volksbank N.V.	100%	Finance	Netherlands

== See also ==
- List of ministers of finance of the Netherlands
