= Frits Bolkestein =

Dutch politician (1933–2025)

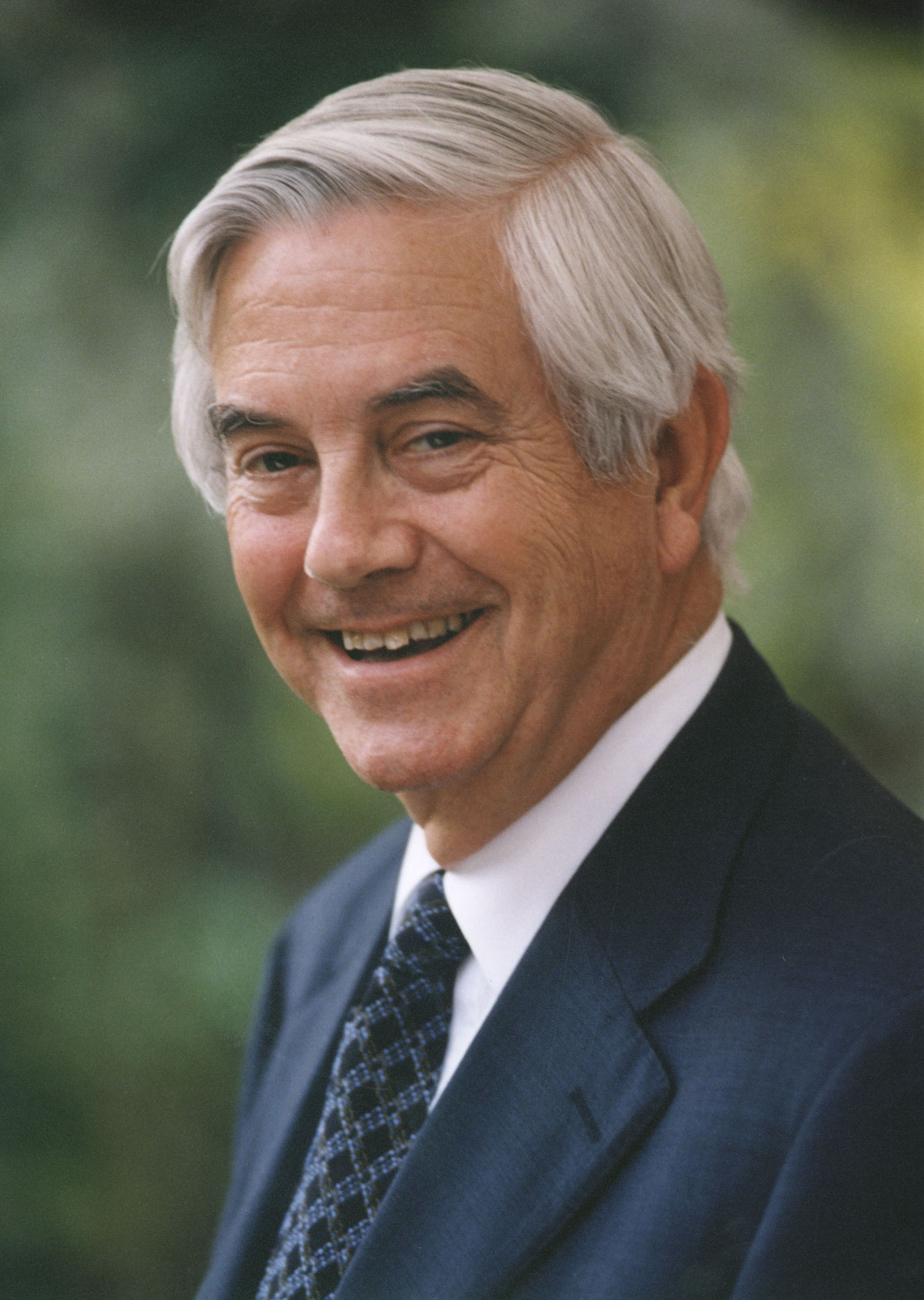
- Bolkestein in 1999

European Commissioner (Note: European Commissioner for Internal Market and Services and Taxation and Customs)
- In office 16 September 1999 – 22 November 2004
- President: Romano Prodi
- Preceded by: Mario Monti as European Commissioner for Internal Market
- Succeeded by: Charlie McCreevy as European Commissioner for Internal Market

President of the Liberal International
- In office 15 April 1996 – 18 April 2000
- Preceded by: Sir David Steel
- Succeeded by: Annemie Neyts-Uyttebroeck

Leader of the People's Party for Freedom and Democracy
- In office 30 April 1990 – 30 July 1998
- Deputy: See list: Loek Hermans (1990) Hans Dijkstal (1990–1998) Benk Korthals (1994–1998) Annemarie Jorritsma (1998) Gerrit Zalm (1998)
- Preceded by: Joris Voorhoeve
- Succeeded by: Hans Dijkstal

Leader of the People's Party for Freedom and Democracy in the House of Representatives
- In office 30 April 1990 – 30 July 1998
- Preceded by: Joris Voorhoeve
- Succeeded by: Hans Dijkstal

Minister of Defence
- In office 24 September 1988 – 7 November 1989
- Prime Minister: Ruud Lubbers
- Preceded by: Piet Bukman (ad interim)
- Succeeded by: Relus ter Beek

State Secretary for Economic Affairs
- In office 5 November 1982 – 14 July 1986 Serving with Piet van Zeil
- Prime Minister: Ruud Lubbers
- Preceded by: Wim Dik
- Succeeded by: Enneüs Heerma

Member of the House of Representatives
- In office 14 September 1989 – 21 September 1999
- In office 3 June 1986 – 24 September 1988
- In office 16 January 1978 – 5 November 1982
- Parliamentary group: People's Party for Freedom and Democracy

Personal details
- Born: Frederik Bolkestein; 4 April 1933 Amsterdam, Netherlands
- Died: 17 February 2025 (aged 91) Laren, Netherlands
- Party: People's Party for Freedom and Democracy (since 1975)
- Relatives: Gerrit Bolkestein (grandfather)
- Education: University of Amsterdam (BSc, MA); London School of Economics (MSc); Leiden University (LLM)
- Occupation: Politician; Energy executive; Nonprofit director; Political commentator; Lobbyist

Frederik "Frits" Bolkestein (Dutch: [ˈfreːdərɪk frɪts ˈbɔlkəstɛin]; 4 April 1933 – 17 February 2025) was a Dutch politician and energy executive who served as Leader of the People's Party for Freedom and Democracy (VVD) from 1990 to 1998 and European Commissioner for Internal Market from 1999 until 2004 under Romano Prodi.

Bolkestein worked as a corporate director for Royal Dutch Shell from May 1960 until July 1976 and as a manager for an engineering company in Amsterdam from September 1976 until January 1978. Bolkestein became a member of the House of Representatives shortly after election of 1977 taking office on 16 January 1978 serving as a frontbencher and spokesman for Economic Affairs. After the election of 1982 Bolkestein was appointed State Secretary for Economic Affairs in the Cabinet Lubbers I taking office on 5 November 1982. After the election of 1986 Bolkestein was not offered a cabinet post in the new cabinet and returned to the House of Representatives on 3 June 1986 serving as a frontbencher and spokesman for Foreign Affairs and International trade. Bolkestein was appointed Minister of Defence in the Cabinet Lubbers II following a cabinet reshuffle taking office on 24 September 1988. After the election of 1989 Bolkestein again returned to the House of Representatives on 14 September 1989. Shortly after the election, party leader and parliamentary leader Joris Voorhoeve announced he was stepping down and Bolkestein announced his candidacy to succeed and was selected as his successor on 30 April 1990.

For the election of 1994, Bolkestein served as lijsttrekker (top candidate) and following a successful cabinet formation with Labour Leader Wim Kok and fellow Liberal Leader Hans van Mierlo formed the Cabinet Kok I with Bolkestein opting to remain as Parliamentary leader. Bolkestein also served as President of the Liberal International from 15 April 1996 until 18 April 2000. For the election of 1998 Bolkestein again served as lijsttrekker (top candidate) but shortly thereafter announced that he was stepping down on 30 July 1998 but continued to serve in the House of Representatives as a backbencher. In August 1999 Bolkestein was nominated as the next European Commissioner in the Prodi Commission, and was given the heavy portfolios of Internal Market and Services and Taxation and Customs serving from 16 September 1999 until 22 November 2004.

== Early life and career ==
Frederik Bolkestein was born on 4 April 1933 in Amsterdam in the Netherlands. His father was president of the Court in Amsterdam. His grandfather, Gerrit Bolkestein, was Minister of Education, Arts, and Sciences to the Dutch government-in-exile of 1939 to 1945. Bolkestein's mother was born in the Dutch East Indies to Dutch parents.

Bolkestein attended the Barlaeus Gymnasium in Amsterdam from 1945 to 1951, where he majored in both arts and sciences. Upon completing his gymnasium education, he was an undergraduate in mathematics at Oregon State College from 1951 to 1953. Subsequently, he went to the University of Amsterdam, where he received a BSc degree in mathematics and physics in 1955. In 1959, he received a MA degree in philosophy and Greek from the same university. Bolkestein went on to earn a BSc degree from The London School of Economics in 1963, and an LLM degree from Leiden University in 1965.

During his studies in Amsterdam, Bolkestein was editor for the satirical student magazine Propria Cures. He was also a member of the board of the student union ASVA. Before entering Dutch politics, Bolkestein worked for the oil company Royal Dutch Shell from 1960 to 1975. During this period he was assigned to postings in East Africa, Honduras and El Salvador, Indonesia, the United Kingdom, and France. In Paris, he served on the board of the Shell Chimie from 1973 to 1975. During his tenure with Shell, he completed the first part of the economics program at the London School of Economics in 1964 and he also completed a law degree at Leiden University, graduating in 1965. In 1976, Bolkestein wrote an English language play named Floris, Count of Holland, under the anagrammatic pseudonym of Niels Kobet.

== Politics and later life ==
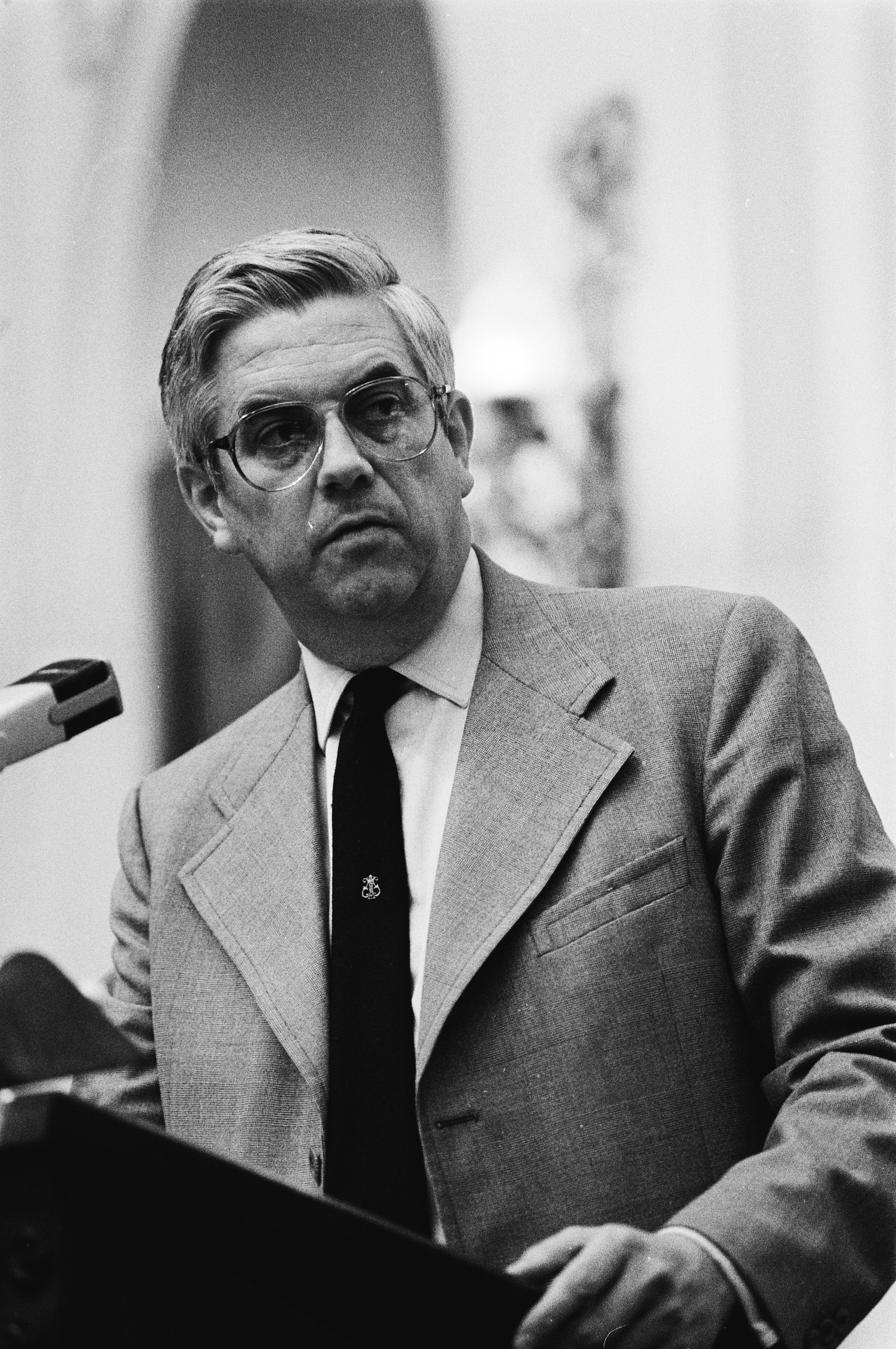
Member of the House of Representatives Frits Bolkestein during a debate on the 1980s oil glut in the House of Representatives on 26 June 1980

Bolkestein left Shell in 1976 and became a member of parliament for the VVD. From 1982 to 1986, he served as Minister of International Trade. After joining the parliament again, he was Minister of Defence from 1988 to 1989. In 1990, he was elected Leader of the People's Party for Freedom and Democracy of the VVD, a position he held until 1998. Between 1978 and 1999, when he became European Commissioner, he was member of parliament for 17 years.

During the 1990s, he was very successful as the political frontman of the VVD. As an opinion leader, he was known for his daring and controversial positions on such issues as multicultural problems in Dutch society, political dualism between government and parliament, and the structure and expansion of the European Union. From 1990 to 1994 he was the parliamentary opposition leader and continued his outspoken and independent style when his party was part of the government from 1994. During the provincial elections of 1995, his criticism of Dutch immigration policies made his party the largest of the country.

In 1996, his political integrity came under heavy criticism, because it was revealed he had written a letter to Health Minister Els Borst, in which he asked her to help a pharmaceutical company, on whose board of commissioners Bolkestein sat. The incident was known as the "Dear Els"-incident, because the letter was addressed to Borst personally. He was president of the Liberal International, the world federation of liberal political parties. As of Autumn 2004, he was a professor at the Dutch universities of Leiden and Delft. Former Irish finance minister Charlie McCreevy succeeded him as Commissioner for the Internal Market.

Bolkestein authored a number of books on politics and related subjects. Frits Bolkestein was until his death married to Femke Boersma, a retired Dutch actress. In 2005, his house in northern France had its electricity cut briefly by the local energy company after he criticized French protectionist measures against incoming electricians from Eastern Europe. In 2010, he was awarded the Prize for Liberty by the Flemish classical-liberal think tank Libera!. Also, he was on the advisory board of OMFIF where he was regularly involved in meetings regarding the financial and monetary system.

Bolkestein died in Laren on 17 February 2025, at the age of 91.

== Bolkestein Directive ==
Named after Frits Bolkestein, the Directive on services in the internal market aims at enabling a company from a given member-state to recruit workers in other European Union countries using the law of its home country. It triggered huge protests in Europe. This directive was voted in the European Parliament in March 2006 and the MEPs proposed amendments to the provisional text. The "principle of origin", which stipulates that workers are employed under the legal arrangements of their own state of residence, was replaced by a new "freedom" principle – freedom to provide services, meaning that administrative obstacles should be removed. The compromise allowed the draft Directive to continue to exist; however, there was a great deal of concern about its effect on social standards and welfare, triggering competition between various parts of Europe. This led to significant protests across Europe against the directive including a notable protest at the European Parliament in Strasbourg by port workers which led to damage to the building. MEPs eventually reached a compromise on the text and the Parliament adopted it on 12 December 2006; two years after Bolkestein left office, under the Barroso Commission.

== Controversies ==
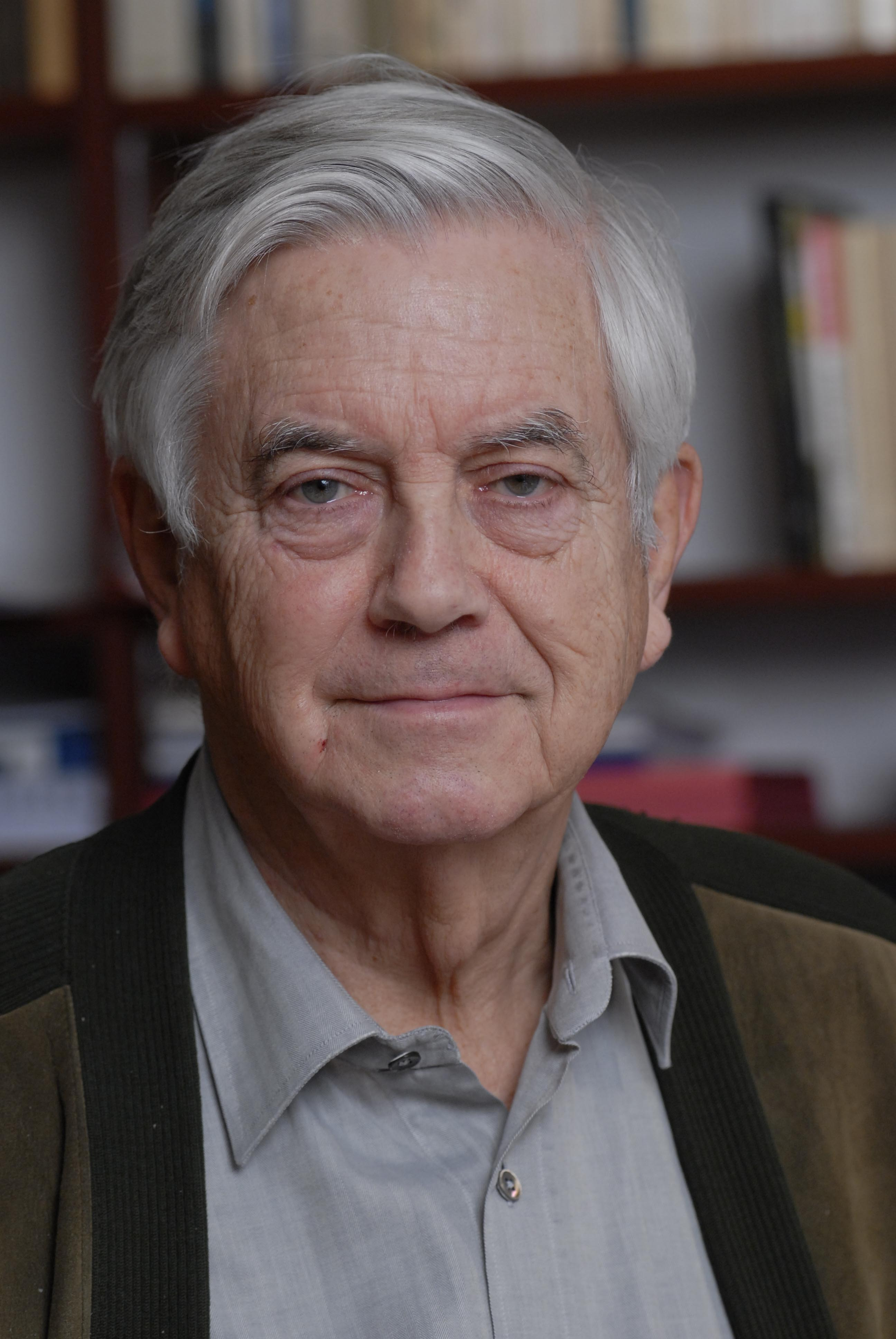
Bolkestein in 2007

In 2001, Bolkestein responded to the question raised by Members of the European Parliament (MEPs) Harlem Désir, Glyn Ford and Francis Wurtz, who asked the Commission to investigate the accusations brought forward by Révélation$, a book written by investigative journalist Denis Robert and former Clearstream member Ernest Backes, as well as to ensure that the 10 June 1990 directive (91/308 CE) on control of financial establishment be applied in all member states in an effective way. Commissioner Bolkestein replied that "the Commission has no reason to date to believe that the Luxembourg authorities do not apply it vigorously" [sic]. The three MEPs henceforth published a press statement asking the opening of an investigation by the European Union about the correct application of 10 June 1990 directive.

On 26 April 2006, French daily 20 minutes revealed that "in May 2005, MEP Paul van Buitenen was shocked by Frits Bolkestein's presence in Bank Menatep's international consultative council (owned by Russian magnate Mikhail Khodorkovsky), a sulfurous Russian banking establishment, and by his work for Shell, British-Dutch petrol company. Two firms 'detaining secret accounts in Clearstream' ... Van Buitenen, also Dutch, then asked for 'clarification' to the European Commission and the opening of a parliamentary investigation. The Commission's president, José Manuel Barroso, answered that these facts "don't bring up any new question" and that it is not known "if Menatep took contact with Bolkestein while he was in his functions". No investigation thereby took place." The free daily underlines that "in 2001, it was Bolkestein himself that announced the Commission's refusal to open up a parliamentary investigation on Clearstream", following MEP Harlem Désir's requests and accusations that Menatep had an "undeclared account" at Clearstream. Bolkestein refused to answer any questions by the newspaper.

On 18 May 2010, Bolkestein advocated for the legalization of all drugs in an article called "Red het land, sta drugs toe", which translates to "Save the nation, allow drugs", in the NRC Handelsblad, a Dutch newspaper. The article was endorsed by many professionals ranging from Els Borst, former Dutch minister of public health, to many jurists, professors and drug experts.

In Het Verval (The Decline), a book about Jews in the Netherlands written by Manfred Gerstenfeld, a Holocaust survivor and senior researcher at the Jerusalem Center for Public Affairs, Bolkestein is quoted as having said that practicing Jews had no future in the Netherlands, due to antisemitism among Turkish and particularly Moroccan immigrants, and that they should emigrate to the United States or Israel. Bolkestein's remarks, after having been published in a Dutch newspaper, raised a storm of criticism in December 2010. According to Ronny Naftaniel, head of the Jewish organisation CIDI, this was not the first time Bolkestein had expressed this view.

== Honours ==
- Netherlands: Knight of the Order of the Netherlands Lion (26 August 1986)
- Netherlands: Commander of the Order of Orange-Nassau (20 November 1989)
- Portugal: Grand Cross of the Order of Merit (14 May 1991)
- Honorary doctorate of laws from the University of Bradford (12 December 2003)
- Netherlands: Commander of the Order of the Netherlands Lion (18 October 2004)
- Germany: Grand Cross of the Order of Merit of the Federal Republic of Germany

== Published books ==
- (1976) Floris, Count of Holland as Niels Kobet
- (1982) Modern Liberalism
- (1990) De Engel en het Beest
- (1992) Woorden hebben hun betekenis
- (1994) Islam en Democratie with Mohammed Arkoun
- (1995) Het Heft in Handen
- (1997) Moslim in de Polder
- (1998) Boren in hard Hout
- (1998) Onverwerkt Verleden
- (2004) De Grenzen van Europa
- (2005) Grensverkenningen
- (2006) De twee lampen van de staatsman
- (2006) Peut-on réformer la France?
- (2008) Overmoed en onverstand
- (2009) De politiek der dingen
- (2011) De goede vreemdeling
- (2011) De intellectuele verleiding (The Intellectual Temptation)
- (2013) Cassandra tegen wil en dank
- (2015) De succesvolle mislukking van Europa, co-edited with Paul Cliteur and Meindert Fennema

== Notes ==
Party political offices
Preceded by Joris Voorhoeve	Leader of the People's Party for Freedom and Democracy; 1990–1998	Succeeded by Hans Dijkstal
Preceded by Joris Voorhoeve	Parliamentary leader of the People's Party for Freedom and Democracy in the House of Representatives; 1990–1998	Succeeded by Hans Dijkstal
Preceded by Joris Voorhoeve; 1989	Lead candidate of the People's Party for Freedom and Democracy; 1994 • 1998	Succeeded by Hans Dijkstal; 2002
Political offices
Preceded by Wim Dik	State Secretary for Economic Affairs; 1982–1986; With: Piet van Zeil	Succeeded by Enneüs Heerma
Preceded by Piet Bukman; Ad interim	Minister of Defence; 1988–1989	Succeeded by Relus ter Beek
Preceded by Sir David Steel	President of the Liberal International; 1996–2000	Succeeded by Annemie Neyts-Uyttebroeck
Preceded by Hans van den Broek	European Commissioner from the Netherlands; 1999–2004	Succeeded by Neelie Kroes
