= List of ministers of economic affairs of the Netherlands =

Minister of Economic Affairs of the Netherlands
- Minister van Economische Zaken
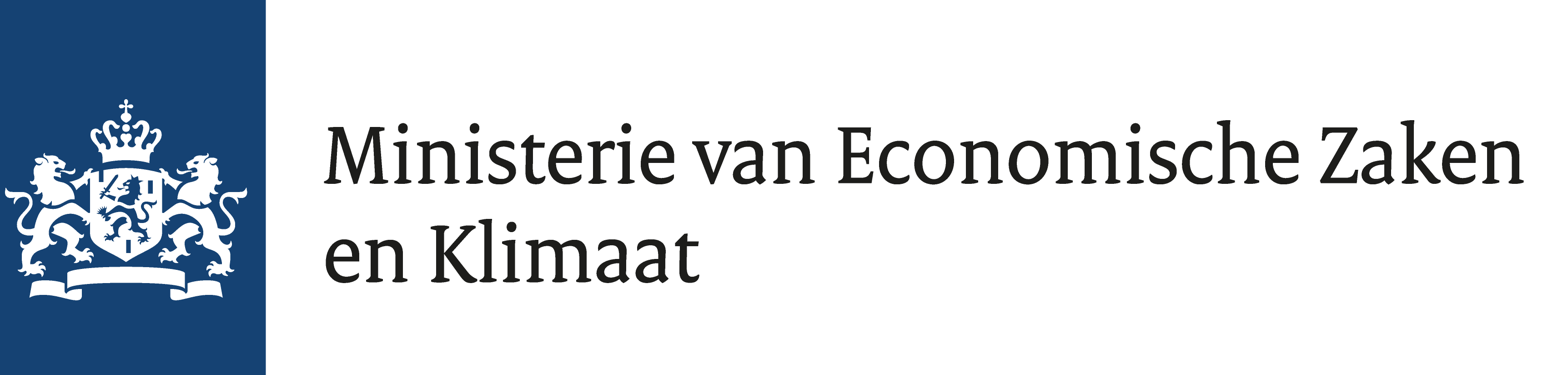
- Ministry of Economic Affairs

- Flag of the Kingdom of the Netherlands
- Ministry of Economic Affairs
- Style: His/Her Excellency
- Member of: Council of Ministers
- Appointer: The monarch; on advice of the prime minister
- First holder: Johannes Goldberg as Secretary for the Economy; 5 July 1799; 227 years ago Johannes Tak van Poortvliet as Minister of Water Management, Commerce and Industry; 3 November 1877; 148 years ago
- Salary: €205,991 (As of 2025)

The minister of economic affairs (Dutch: Minister van Economische Zaken) is the head of the Ministry of Economic Affairs and a member of the Cabinet and the Council of Ministers. Regularly, a state secretary was assigned to the ministry tasked with specific portfolios. There has once been a minister without portfolio assigned to the ministry.

== List of ministers of economic affairs ==
=== 1877–1945 ===
Minister of Water Management, Commerce and Industry		Term of office	Party	Prime Minister (Cabinet)
Johannes Tak van Poortvliet	Johannes Tak van Poortvliet (1839–1904)	3 November 1877 – 20 August 1879	Independent; Classical Liberal	Jan Kappeyne van de Coppello (Kappeyne van de Coppello)
	Jonkheer; Guillaume Klerck (1825–1884)	20 August 1879 – 23 April 1883	Independent; Conservative Liberal	Theo van Lynden van Sandenburg (Van Lynden van Sandenburg)
Johannes van den Bergh	Johannes van den Bergh (1824–1890)	23 April 1883 – 10 June 1887^{[Res]}	Independent; Christian Democratic; Conservative Catholic	Jan Heemskerk (J. Heemskerk)
Frederik Cornelis Tromp	Frederik; Cornelis Tromp (Minister of the Navy) (1828–1900)	10 June 1887 – 11 July 1887^{[Ad Interim]}	Independent; Conservative Liberal	Jan Heemskerk (J. Heemskerk)
Jacob Bastert	Jacob Bastert (1826–1902)	11 July 1887 – 21 April 1888	Independent; Conservative Liberal	Jan Heemskerk (J. Heemskerk)
Jacob Havelaar	Jacob Havelaar (1840–1918)	21 April 1888 – 21 August 1891	Anti-Revolutionary; Party	Aeneas Mackay (Mackay)
Cornelis Lely	Cornelis Lely (1854–1929)	21 August 1891 – 9 May 1894	Liberal Union	Gijsbert van Tienhoven (Van Tienhoven)
Philippe van der Sleijden	Philippe van der Sleijden (1842–1923)	9 May 1894 – 27 July 1897	Independent; Classical Liberal	Joan Röell (Röell)
Cornelis Lely	Cornelis Lely (1854–1929)	27 July 1897 – 1 August 1901	Liberal Union	Nicolaas Pierson (Pierson)
Johannes Christiaan de Marez Oyens	Johannes Christiaan de Marez Oyens (1845–1911)	1 August 1901 – 17 August 1905	Anti-Revolutionary; Party	Abraham Kuyper (Kuyper)
Jacob Kraus	Jacob Kraus (1861–1951)	17 August 1905 – 1 July 1906^{[App]}	Liberal Union	Theo de Meester (De Meester)
Minister of Agriculture, Commerce and Industry		Term of office	Party	Prime Minister (Cabinet)
Jacob Veegens	Jacob Veegens (1845–1910)	1 July 1906 – 12 February 1908	Free-thinking; Democratic League	Theo de Meester (De Meester)
Syb Talma	Syb Talma (1864–1916)	12 February 1908 – 29 August 1913	Anti-Revolutionary; Party	Theo Heemskerk (T. Heemskerk)
Willem Treub	Willem Treub (also Minister of Finance; 1914) (1858–1931)	29 August 1913 – 19 November 1914^{[App]}	Free-thinking; Democratic League	Pieter Cort van der Linden (Cort van der Linden)
Folkert Posthuma	Folkert Posthuma (1874–1943)	19 November 1914 – 9 September 1918	Independent; Conservative Liberal	Pieter Cort van der Linden (Cort van der Linden)
Hendrik van IJsselsteyn	Hendrik van IJsselsteyn (1874–1942)	9 September 1918 – 13 September 1922^{[Res]}	Independent; Christian Democratic; Protestant	Charles Ruijs de Beerenbrouck (Ruijs de Beerenbrouck I)
Charles Ruijs de Beerenbrouck	Jonkheer; Charles Ruijs de Beerenbrouck (Prime Minister) (1873–1936)	13 September 1922 – 1 January 1923^{[Acting]}	Roman Catholic; State Party	Charles Ruijs de Beerenbrouck (Ruijs de Beerenbrouck I)
Charles Ruijs de Beerenbrouck	Jonkheer; Charles Ruijs de Beerenbrouck (Prime Minister) (1873–1936)	13 September 1922 – 1 January 1923^{[Acting]}	Roman Catholic; State Party	Charles Ruijs de Beerenbrouck (Ruijs de Beerenbrouck II)
Minister of Labour, Commerce and Industry		Term of office	Party	Prime Minister (Cabinet)
Piet Aalberse	Piet Aalberse (also Minister of Labour; 1918–1923) (1871–1948)	1 January 1923 – 4 August 1925	Roman Catholic; State Party	Charles Ruijs de Beerenbrouck (Ruijs de Beerenbrouck II)
Dionysius Koolen	Dr. Dionysius Koolen (1871–1945)	4 August 1925 – 8 March 1926	Roman Catholic; State Party	Hendrikus Colijn (Colijn I)
Jan Rudolph Slotemaker de Bruïne	Dr. Jan Rudolph; Slotemaker de Bruïne (1869–1941)	8 March 1926 – 10 August 1929	Christian Historical Union	Dirk Jan de Geer (De Geer I)
Timotheus Verschuur	Timotheus; Verschuur (1886–1945)	10 August 1929 – 1 May 1932	Roman Catholic; State Party	Charles Ruijs de Beerenbrouck (Ruijs de Beerenbrouck III)
Minister of Economic Affairs and Labour		Term of office	Party	Prime Minister (Cabinet)
Timotheus Verschuur	Timotheus; Verschuur (1886–1945)	1 May 1932 – 8 June 1933	Roman Catholic; State Party	Charles Ruijs de Beerenbrouck (Ruijs de Beerenbrouck III)
Timotheus Verschuur	Timotheus; Verschuur (1886–1945)	1 May 1932 – 8 June 1933	Roman Catholic; State Party	Hendrikus Colijn (Colijn II)
Minister of Economic Affairs		Term of office	Party	Prime Minister (Cabinet)
Timotheus Verschuur	Timotheus; Verschuur (1886–1945)	8 June 1933 – 17 April 1934	Roman Catholic; State Party	Hendrikus Colijn (Colijn II)
Hendrikus Colijn	Dr. Hendrikus Colijn (Prime Minister) (1869–1944)	17 April 1934 – 25 June 1934^{[Ad interim]}	Anti-Revolutionary; Party	Hendrikus Colijn (Colijn II)
Max Steenberghe	Max Steenberghe (also Minister of Agriculture and Fisheries) (1899–1972)	25 June 1934 – 6 June 1935	Roman Catholic; State Party	Hendrikus Colijn (Colijn II)
Henri Gelissen	Dr. Henri Gelissen (1895–1982)	6 June 1935 – 2 September 1935	Roman Catholic; State Party	Hendrikus Colijn (Colijn II)
Henri Gelissen	Dr. Henri Gelissen (1895–1982)	6 June 1935 – 2 September 1935	Roman Catholic; State Party	Hendrikus Colijn (Colijn III)
Minister of Commerce, Industry and Shipping		Term of office	Party	Prime Minister (Cabinet)
Henri Gelissen	Dr. Henri Gelissen (1895–1982)	2 September 1935 – 24 June 1937	Roman Catholic; State Party	Hendrikus Colijn (Colijn III)
Max Steenberghe	Max Steenberghe (also Minister of Agriculture and Fisheries) (1899–1972)	24 June 1937 – 15 July 1937	Roman Catholic; State Party	Hendrikus Colijn (Colijn IV)
Minister of Economic Affairs		Term of office	Party	Prime Minister (Cabinet)
Max Steenberghe	Max Steenberghe (1899–1972)	15 July 1937 – 25 July 1939	Roman Catholic; State Party	Hendrikus Colijn (Colijn IV)
Hendrikus Colijn	Dr. Hendrikus Colijn (Prime Minister) (1869–1944)	25 July 1939 – 10 August 1939	Anti-Revolutionary; Party	Hendrikus Colijn (Colijn V)
Max Steenberghe	Max Steenberghe (1899–1972)	10 August 1939 – 10 May 1940	Roman Catholic; State Party	Dirk Jan de Geer (De Geer II)
Minister of Commerce, Industry and Shipping		Term of office	Party	Prime Minister (Cabinet)
Max Steenberghe	Max Steenberghe (also Minister of Finance and Minister of Agriculture and Fisheries 1941) (1899–1972)	10 May 1940 – 17 November 1941^{[Res]}	Roman Catholic; State Party	Dirk Jan de Geer (De Geer II)
Max Steenberghe	Max Steenberghe (also Minister of Finance and Minister of Agriculture and Fisheries 1941) (1899–1972)	10 May 1940 – 17 November 1941^{[Res]}	Roman Catholic; State Party	Pieter Sjoerds Gerbrandy (Gerbrandy I)
Max Steenberghe	Max Steenberghe (also Minister of Finance and Minister of Agriculture and Fisheries 1941) (1899–1972)	10 May 1940 – 17 November 1941^{[Res]}	Roman Catholic; State Party	Pieter Sjoerds Gerbrandy (Gerbrandy II)
Jan van den Tempel	Dr. Jan van den Tempel (also Minister of Social Affairs and Minister of Agriculture and Fisheries) (1877–1955)	17 November 1941 – 8 January 1942^{[Ad interim]}	Social Democratic; Workers' Party	Pieter Sjoerds Gerbrandy (Gerbrandy II)
Piet Kerstens	Piet Kerstens (also Minister of Agriculture and Fisheries) (1896–1958)	8 January 1942 – 31 May 1944^{[Dismissed]}	Roman Catholic; State Party	Pieter Sjoerds Gerbrandy (Gerbrandy II)
Minister of Commerce, Industry and Agriculture		Term of office	Party	Prime Minister (Cabinet)
Johannes van den Broek	Johannes van den Broek (1882–1946)	31 May 1944 – 23 February 1945^{[1]}	Independent; Liberal (Classical Liberal)	Pieter Sjoerds Gerbrandy (Gerbrandy II)
Hans Gispen	Hans Gispen (1905–1968)	23 February 1945 – 25 June 1945	Anti-Revolutionary; Party	Pieter Sjoerds Gerbrandy (Gerbrandy III)

=== Since 1945 ===
Minister of Commerce and Industry		Term of office	Party	Prime Minister (Cabinet)
Hein Vos	Hein Vos (1903–1972)	25 June 1945 – 3 July 1946	Social Democratic; Workers' Party	Willem; Schermerhorn (Schermerhorn– Drees)
Hein Vos	Hein Vos (1903–1972)	25 June 1945 – 3 July 1946	Labour Party	Willem; Schermerhorn (Schermerhorn– Drees)
Minister of Economic Affairs		Term of office	Party	Prime Minister (Cabinet)
Gerard Huysmans	Gerard Huysmans (1902–1948)	3 July 1946 – 14 January 1948^{[Res]}	Catholic; People's Party	Louis Beel (Beel I)
Sicco Mansholt	Sicco Mansholt (1908–1995)	14 January 1948 – 20 January 1948^{[Ad Interim]} ^{[Minister]}	Labour Party	Louis Beel (Beel I)
Jan van den Brink	Jan van den Brink (1915–2006)	21 January 1948 – 2 September 1952	Catholic; People's Party	Louis Beel (Beel I)
Jan van den Brink	Jan van den Brink (1915–2006)	21 January 1948 – 2 September 1952	Catholic; People's Party	Willem Drees (Drees–Van Schaik • Drees I)
Jelle Zijlstra	Jelle Zijlstra (1918–2001)	2 September 1952 – 19 May 1959^{[Minister]}	Anti-Revolutionary; Party	Willem Drees (Drees II • III)
Jelle Zijlstra	Jelle Zijlstra (1918–2001)	2 September 1952 – 19 May 1959^{[Minister]}	Anti-Revolutionary; Party	Louis Beel (Beel II)
Jan de Pous	Jan de Pous (1920–1996)	19 May 1959 – 24 July 1963	Christian; Historical Union	Jan de Quay (De Quay)
Koos Andriessen	Koos; Andriessen (1928–2019)	24 July 1963 – 14 April 1965	Christian; Historical Union	Victor Marijnen (Marijnen)
Joop den Uyl	Joop den Uyl (1919–1987)	14 April 1965 – 22 November 1966	Labour Party	Jo Cals (Cals)
Joop Bakker	Joop Bakker (1921–2003)	22 November 1966 – 5 April 1967	Anti-Revolutionary; Party	Jelle Zijlstra (Zijlstra)
Leo de Block	Leo de Block (1904–1988)	5 April 1967 – 7 January 1970^{[Res]}	Catholic; People's Party	Piet de Jong (De Jong)
Johan Witteveen	Johan Witteveen (1921–2019)^{[Deputy]}	7 January 1970 – 14 January 1970^{[Ad Interim]} ^{[Minister]}	People's Party for Freedom and Democracy	Piet de Jong (De Jong)
Roelof Nelissen	Roelof; Nelissen (1931–2019)	14 January 1970 – 6 July 1971	Catholic; People's Party	Piet de Jong (De Jong)
Harry Langman	Harrie Langman (1931–2016)	6 July 1971 – 11 May 1973	People's Party for Freedom and Democracy	Barend Biesheuvel (Biesheuvel I • II)
Ruud Lubbers	Ruud Lubbers (1939–2018)	11 May 1973 – 19 December 1977	Catholic; People's Party	Joop den Uyl (Den Uyl)
Gijs van Aardenne	Gijs van Aardenne (1930–1995)	19 December 1977 – 11 September 1981	People's Party for Freedom and Democracy	Dries van Agt (Van Agt I)
Jan Terlouw	Jan Terlouw (1931–2025)^{[Deputy]}	11 September 1981 – 4 November 1982	Democrats 66	Dries van Agt (Van Agt II • III)
Gijs van Aardenne	Gijs van Aardenne (1930–1995)^{[Deputy]}	4 November 1982 – 14 July 1986	People's Party for Freedom and Democracy	Ruud Lubbers (Lubbers I)
Rudolf de Korte	Rudolf de Korte (1936–2020)^{[Deputy]}	14 July 1986 – 7 November 1989	People's Party for Freedom and Democracy	Ruud Lubbers (Lubbers II)
Koos Andriessen	Koos; Andriessen (1928–2019)	7 November 1989 – 22 August 1994	Christian; Democratic Appeal	Ruud Lubbers (Lubbers III)
Hans Wijers	Hans Wijers (born 1951)	22 August 1994 – 3 August 1998	Democrats 66	Wim Kok (Kok I)
Annemarie Jorritsma	Annemarie; Jorritsma (born 1950)^{[Deputy]}	3 August 1998 – 22 July 2002	People's Party for Freedom and Democracy	Wim Kok (Kok II)
Herman Heinsbroek	Herman; Heinsbroek (born 1951)	22 July 2002 – 16 October 2002^{[Res]}	Pim Fortuyn List	Jan Peter; Balkenende (Balkenende I)
Hans Hoogervorst	Hans Hoogervorst (born 1956)	16 October 2002 – 27 May 2003^{[Acting]} ^{[Minister]}	People's Party for Freedom and Democracy	Jan Peter; Balkenende (Balkenende I)
Laurens Jan Brinkhorst	Laurens Jan; Brinkhorst (born 1937)^{[Deputy]}	27 May 2003 – 3 July 2006^{[Res]}	Democrats 66	Jan Peter; Balkenende (Balkenende II)
Gerrit Zalm	Gerrit Zalm (born 1952)^{[Deputy]}	3 July 2006 – 7 July 2006^{[Ad Interim]} ^{[Minister]}	People's Party for Freedom and Democracy	Jan Peter; Balkenende (Balkenende II)
Joop Wijn	Joop Wijn (born 1969)	7 July 2006 – 22 February 2007	Christian; Democratic Appeal	Jan Peter; Balkenende (Balkenende III)
Maria van der Hoeven	Maria van der Hoeven (born 1949)	22 February 2007 – 14 October 2010	Christian; Democratic Appeal	Jan Peter; Balkenende (Balkenende IV)
Minister of Economic Affairs, Agriculture and Innovation		Term of office	Party	Prime Minister (Cabinet)
Maxime Verhagen	Maxime; Verhagen (born 1956)^{[Deputy]}	14 October 2010 – 5 November 2012	Christian; Democratic Appeal	Mark Rutte (Rutte I)
Minister of Economic Affairs		Term of office	Party	Prime Minister (Cabinet)
Henk Kamp	Henk Kamp (born 1952)	5 November 2012 – 26 October 2017	People's Party for Freedom and Democracy	Mark Rutte (Rutte II)
Minister of Economic Affairs and Climate Policy		Term of office	Party	Prime Minister (Cabinet)
Eric Wiebes	Eric Wiebes (born 1963)	26 October 2017 – 15 January 2021^{[Res]}	People's Party for Freedom and Democracy	Mark Rutte (Rutte III)
Cora van Nieuwenhuizen	Cora van Nieuwenhuizen (born 1963)	15 January 2021 – 20 January 2021^{[Ad Interim]} ^{[Minister]}	People's Party for Freedom and Democracy	Mark Rutte (Rutte III)
Bas van 't Wout	Bas van 't Wout (born 1979)	20 January 2021 – 25 May 2021^{[Note]} ^{[Res]}	People's Party for Freedom and Democracy	Mark Rutte (Rutte III)
Stef Blok	Stef Blok (born 1964)	25 May 2021 – 10 January 2022^{[Acting]}	People's Party for Freedom and Democracy	Mark Rutte (Rutte III)
Micky Adriaansens	Micky; Adriaansens (born 1964)	10 January 2022 – 2 July 2024	People's Party for Freedom and Democracy	Mark Rutte (Rutte IV)
Minister of Economic Affairs		Term of office	Party	Prime Minister (Cabinet)
	Dirk Beljaarts (born 1978)	2 January 2024 – 3 June 2025^{[Res]}	Party for Freedom	Dick Schoof (Schoof)
Eelco Heinen	Eelco Heinen (born 1981)	3 June 2025 – 29 June 2023^{[Ad Interim]} ^{[Minister]}	People's Party for Freedom and Democracy	Dick Schoof (Schoof)
Vincent Karremans	Vincent; Karremans (born 1986)	29 June 2025 – 23 February 2026	People's Party for Freedom and Democracy	Dick Schoof (Schoof)
	Heleen Herbert (born 1972)	23 February 2026 – Incumbent	Christian; Democratic Appeal	Rob Jetten (Jetten)

^{Resigned}
^{Dismissed}
^{Acting}
^{Acting from 25 May 2021 until 10 August 2021}
^{Ad Interim}
^{Medical leave of absence from 25 May 2021 until 10 August 2021}
^{Deputy Prime Minister}
^{Appointed as Minister of Water Management}
^{Appointed as Minister of Finance}
^{Minister of Finance}
^{Minister of Agriculture, Fisheries and Food Supplies}
^{Minister of Finance from 22 December 1958}
^{Minister of Infrastructure and Water Management}

== List of ministers without portfolio ==
Minister without Portfolio		Portfolio(s)	Term of office	Party	Prime Minister (Cabinet)
Rob Jetten	Rob Jetten (born 1987)	• Climate Policy • Environment • Energy • Nuclear • Renewable Energy	10 January 2022 – 2 July 2024	Democrats 66	Mark Rutte (Rutte IV)

== List of state secretaries for economic affairs ==
State Secretary for Economic Affairs		Portfolio(s)	Term of office	Party	Prime Minister (Cabinet)
Wim van der Grinten	Wim van der Grinten (1913–1994)	• Public; Organisations • Small and Medium-sized; Businesses	29 January 1949 – 15 March 1951	Catholic; People's Party	Willem Drees (Drees– Van Schaik)
Gerard Veldkamp	Gerard Veldkamp (1921–1990)	• Small and Medium-sized; Businesses • Consumer; Protection • Tourism	10 October 1952 – 17 July 1961^{[App]}	Catholic; People's Party	Willem Drees (Drees II • III)
Gerard Veldkamp	Gerard Veldkamp (1921–1990)	• Small and Medium-sized; Businesses • Consumer; Protection • Tourism	10 October 1952 – 17 July 1961^{[App]}	Catholic; People's Party	Louis Beel (Beel II)
Gerard Veldkamp	Gerard Veldkamp (1921–1990)	• Small and Medium-sized; Businesses • Consumer; Protection • Tourism	10 October 1952 – 17 July 1961^{[App]}	Catholic; People's Party	Jan de Quay (De Quay)
Frans Gijzels	Frans Gijzels (1911–1977)	• Small and Medium-sized; Businesses • Consumer; Protection • Tourism	14 September 1961 – 24 July 1963	Catholic; People's Party	Jan de Quay (De Quay)
Joop Bakker	Joop Bakker (1921–2003)	• Small and Medium-sized; Businesses • Regional; Development	3 September 1963 – 22 November 1966	Anti-Revolutionary; Party	Victor Marijnen (Marijnen)
Joop Bakker	Joop Bakker (1921–2003)	• Small and Medium-sized; Businesses • Regional; Development	3 September 1963 – 22 November 1966	Anti-Revolutionary; Party	Jo Cals (Cals)
Louis van Son	Louis van Son (1922–1986)	• Small and Medium-sized; Businesses • Regional; Development	28 November 1966 – 6 July 1971	Catholic; People's Party	Jelle Zijlstra (Zijlstra)
Louis van Son	Louis van Son (1922–1986)	• Trade and Export • Small and Medium-sized; Businesses • Regional; Development • Consumer; Protection • Tourism	28 November 1966 – 6 July 1971	Catholic; People's Party	Piet de Jong (De Jong)
Jan Oostenbrink	Jan Oostenbrink (1936–2025)	• Small and Medium-sized; Businesses • Consumer; Protection • Tourism	17 July 1971 – 11 May 1973	Catholic; People's Party	Barend Biesheuvel (Biesheuvel I • II)
Ted Hazekamp	Ted Hazekamp (1926–1987)	• Small and Medium-sized; Businesses • Regional; Development • Consumer; Protection • Tourism	11 May 1973 – 11 September 1981	Catholic; People's Party	Joop den Uyl (Den Uyl)
Ted Hazekamp	Ted Hazekamp (1926–1987)	• Small and Medium-sized; Businesses • Regional; Development • Consumer; Protection • Tourism	11 May 1973 – 11 September 1981	Christian; Democratic Appeal	Dries van Agt (Van Agt I)
Has Beyen	Has Beyen (1923–2002)	• Trade and Export	9 January 1978 – 11 September 1981	People's Party for Freedom and Democracy	Dries van Agt (Van Agt I)
Piet van Zeil	Piet van Zeil (1927–2012)	• Small and Medium-sized; Businesses • Regional; Development • Consumer; Protection • Tourism	11 September 1981 – 22 June 1986^{[State Secretary]} ^{[App]}	Christian; Democratic Appeal	Dries van Agt (Van Agt II • III)
Piet van Zeil	Piet van Zeil (1927–2012)	• Small and Medium-sized; Businesses • Regional; Development • Consumer; Protection • Tourism	11 September 1981 – 22 June 1986^{[State Secretary]} ^{[App]}	Christian; Democratic Appeal	Ruud Lubbers (Lubbers I)
Wim Dik	Wim Dik (1939–2022)	• Trade and Export	11 September 1981 – 4 November 1982	Democrats 66	Dries van Agt (Van Agt II • III)
Frits Bolkestein	Frits Bolkestein (1933–2025)	• Trade and Export^{[Title]}	4 November 1982 – 14 July 1986	People's Party for Freedom and Democracy	Ruud Lubbers (Lubbers I)
Enneüs Heerma	Enneüs Heerma (1944–1999)	• Trade and Export^{[Title]}	17 July 1986 – 27 October 1986^{[App]}	Christian; Democratic Appeal	Ruud Lubbers (Lubbers II)
Yvonne van Rooy	Yvonne van Rooy (born 1951)	• Trade and Export^{[Title]}	30 October 1986 – 7 November 1989	Christian; Democratic Appeal	Ruud Lubbers (Lubbers II)
Albert-Jan Evenhuis	Albert-Jan; Evenhuis (1941–2011)	• Small and Medium-sized; Businesses • Regional; Development • Consumer; Protection • Tourism	14 July 1986 – 30 June 1989^{[Res]}	People's Party for Freedom and Democracy	Ruud Lubbers (Lubbers II)
Piet Bukman	Piet Bukman (1934–2022)	• Trade and Export • Regional; Development • Consumer; Protection • Tourism^{[Title]}	7 November 1989 – 28 September 1990^{[App]}	Christian; Democratic Appeal	Ruud Lubbers (Lubbers III)
Yvonne van Rooy	Yvonne van Rooy (born 1951)	• Trade and Export • Regional; Development • Consumer; Protection • Tourism^{[Title]}	28 September 1990 – 22 August 1994	Christian; Democratic Appeal	Ruud Lubbers (Lubbers III)
Anneke van Dok-van Weele	Anneke van Dok -van Weele (born 1947)	• Trade and Export • Consumer; Protection • Tourism^{[Title]}	22 August 1994 – 3 August 1998	Labour Party	Wim Kok (Kok I)
Gerrit Ybema	Gerrit Ybema (1945–2012)	• Trade and Export • Small and Medium-sized; Businesses • Regional; Development • Consumer; Protection • Tourism^{[Title]}	3 August 1998 – 22 July 2002	Democrats 66	Wim Kok (Kok II)
Joop Wijn	Joop Wijn (born 1969)	• Trade and Export • Consumer; Protection • Telecommunication • Postal Service • Tourism	22 July 2002 – 27 May 2003	Christian; Democratic Appeal	Jan Peter; Balkenende (Balkenende I)
Karien van Gennip	Karien van Gennip (born 1968)	• Trade and Export • Small and Medium-sized; Businesses • Regional; Development • Consumer; Protection • Tourism	27 May 2003 – 22 February 2007	Christian; Democratic Appeal	Jan Peter; Balkenende (Balkenende II • III)
Frank Heemskerk	Frank Heemskerk (born 1969)	• Trade and Export • Small and Medium-sized; Businesses • Consumer; Protection • Telecommunication • Postal Service • Tourism^{[Title]}	22 February 2007 – 23 February 2010^{[Res]}	Labour Party	Jan Peter; Balkenende (Balkenende IV)
State Secretary for Economic Affairs, Agriculture and Innovation		Portfolio(s)	Term of office	Party	Prime Minister (Cabinet)
Henk Bleker	Henk Bleker (born 1953)	• Trade and Export • Agriculture • Food Policy • Fisheries • Forestry • Postal Service • Tourism • Animal Welfare^{[Title]}	14 October 2010 – 5 November 2012	Christian; Democratic Appeal	Mark Rutte (Rutte I)
State Secretary for Economic Affairs		Portfolio(s)	Term of office	Party	Prime Minister (Cabinet)
Co Verdaas	Co Verdaas (born 1966)	• Agriculture • Food Policy • Nature • Fisheries • Forestry • Animal Welfare • Tourism^{[Title]}	5 November 2012 – 6 December 2012^{[Res]}	Labour Party	Mark Rutte (Rutte II)
Sharon Dijksma	Sharon Dijksma (born 1971)	• Agriculture • Food Policy • Nature • Fisheries • Forestry • Animal Welfare • Tourism^{[Title]}	18 December 2012 – 3 November 2015^{[App]}	Labour Party	Mark Rutte (Rutte II)
Martijn van Dam	Martijn van Dam (born 1978)	• Agriculture • Food Policy • Nature • Fisheries • Forestry • Animal Welfare • Tourism^{[Title]}	3 November 2015 – 1 September 2017^{[Res]}	Labour Party	Mark Rutte (Rutte II)
State Secretary for Economic Affairs and Climate Policy		Portfolio(s)	Term of office	Party	Prime Minister (Cabinet)
Mona Keijzer	Mona Keijzer (born 1968)	• Small and Medium-sized; Businesses • Consumer; Protection • Telecommunication • Postal Service	26 October 2017 – 25 September 2021^{[Dis]}	Christian; Democratic Appeal	Mark Rutte (Rutte III)
Dilan Yeşilgöz-Zegerius	Dilan Yeşilgöz- Zegerius (born 1977)	• Energy policy • Renewable energy policy • Nuclear energy policy • Environmental policy • Climate change policy	25 May 2021 – 10 January 2022	People's Party for Freedom and Democracy	Mark Rutte (Rutte III)
Hans Vijlbrief	Hans Vijlbrief (born 1963)	• Mining • Extractivism	10 January 2022 – 2 July 2024	Democrats 66	Mark Rutte (Rutte IV)

^{Resigned}
^{Dismissed}
^{Designated with the diplomatic rank of Minister}
^{State Secretary for Social Affairs and Employment from 12 June 1982 until 4 November 1982}
^{Appointed as Minister of Social Affairs and Health}
^{Appointed as Mayor of Heerlen}
^{Appointed as State Secretary for Housing, Spatial Planning and the Environment}
^{Appointed as Minister of Agriculture and Fisheries}
^{Appointed as State Secretary for Infrastructure and the Environment}

== See also ==
- Ministry of Economic Affairs and Climate Policy
