= Judith Tielen =

Dutch politician (born 1972)

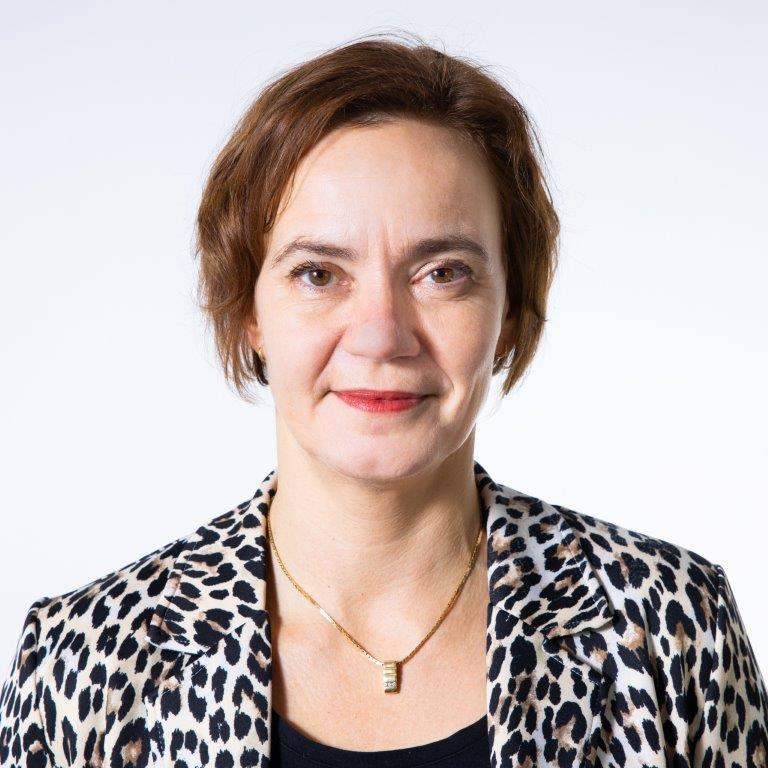
- Tielen in 2020

State Secretary Education, Culture and Science
- Incumbent
- Assumed office 23 February 2026
- Minister: Rianne Letschert
- Cabinet: Jetten
- Preceded by: Koen Becking

State Secretary for Youth, Prevention and Sport
- In office 19 June 2025 – 23 February 2026
- Minister: Daniëlle Jansen (2025); Jan Anthonie Bruijn (2025–2026)
- Cabinet: Schoof
- Preceded by: Vincent Karremans
- Succeeded by: Mirjam Sterk (as Minister of Long-term Care, Youth and Sport)

Member of the House of Representatives
- In office 31 October 2017 – 19 June 2025

Member of the Municipal Council of Utrecht
- In office March 2014 – June 2025

Personal details
- Born: Judith Zsuzsanna Cornélie Maria Tielen; 2 April 1972 (age 54) Arnhem, Netherlands
- Party: People's Party for Freedom and Democracy (since 1998)
- Education: Utrecht University
- Website: www.judithtielen.com

Judith Zsuzsanna Cornélie Maria Tielen (born 2 April 1972) is a Dutch politician of the People's Party for Freedom and Democracy (VVD). Since 23 February 2026 she has served as State Secretary Education, Culture and Science. Before that she served as State Secretary for Youth, Prevention and Sport in the demissionary Schoof cabinet and as a member of the House of Representatives from 2017 to 2025, and as a member of the Utrecht municipal council from 2014 to 2017.

== Early life and education ==
Tielen was born on 2 April 1972 in Arnhem, and grew up in Velswijk. Through her mother's lineage, she is of Hungarian and German descent. She studied medicine and healthcare management at Utrecht University, graduating as a medical doctor in 1996.

== Career ==
Before entering politics, Tielen worked as a strategic marketing consultant and later as a lecturer and researcher in marketing and innovation at HU University of Applied Sciences Utrecht. She also ran her own advisory bureau, combining her background in healthcare with expertise in communication and organisational strategy.

Her political career began at the local level in Utrecht, where she served as a municipal councillor from 2014 to 2017. In October 2017, she became a member of the House of Representatives, where she remained until June 2025. As a member of parliament, Tielen concentrated on healthcare policy, youth care, medicines and prevention. Together with Wieke Paulusma of the Democrats 66 (D66), she introduced a bill that would require daycare centres to refuse admission to children not participating in the National Immunisation Programme. She also proposed to increase testing for coeliac disease in young children, and took part in the parliamentary inquiry into gas extraction in Groningen.

On 19 June 2025, she succeeded Vincent Karremans as State Secretary for Health, Welfare and Sport in the Schoof cabinet. In this role, she is responsible for youth policy, prevention and sport.

== Personal life ==
Tielen is married and has three children. She lives in Utrecht.

== Electoral history ==
Electoral history of Judith Tielen
Year	Body	Party	Pos.	Votes	Result		Ref.
Year	Body	Party	Pos.	Votes	Party seats	Individual	Ref.
2017	House of Representatives	People's Party for Freedom and Democracy	38	1,928	33	Lost (Note: Tielen was appointed to the body later during the term due to a vacancy.)	
2021	House of Representatives	People's Party for Freedom and Democracy	27	2,127	34	Won	
2023	House of Representatives	People's Party for Freedom and Democracy	15	2,214	24	Won	
