= Ted Hazekamp =

Dutch politician (1926–1987)

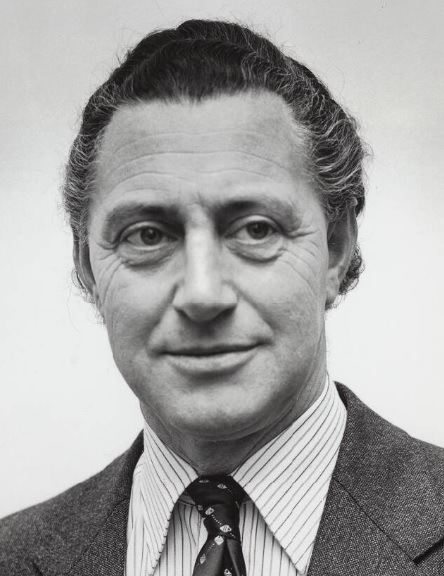
- Hazekamp in 1977

State Secretary for Economic Affairs
- In office 28 December 1977 – 11 September 1981 Serving with Has Beyen (1978–1981)
- Prime Minister: Dries van Agt
- Preceded by: Himself
- Succeeded by: Piet van Zeil; Wim Dik
- In office 11 May 1973 – 8 September 1977
- Prime Minister: Joop den Uyl
- Preceded by: Jan Oostenbrink
- Succeeded by: Himself

Member of the House of Representatives
- In office 8 June 1977 – 28 December 1977
- In office 26 October 1971 – 7 December 1972
- Parliamentary group: Catholic People's Party

Personal details
- Born: Theodorus Maria Hazekamp; 1 December 1926 The Hague, Netherlands
- Died: 19 March 1987 (aged 60) Nieuwkoop, Netherlands
- Party: Christian Democratic Appeal (from 1980)
- Other political affiliations: Catholic People's Party (until 1980)
- Spouse: Paulina Alphonsa Maria Lohmeijer (m. 1955)
- Education: Erasmus University Rotterdam (Candidate)
- Occupation: Politician; Civil servant; Trade association executive; Businessman; Corporate director; Nonprofit director; Hospital administrator

Theodorus Maria "Ted" Hazekamp (1 December 1926 – 19 March 1987) was a Dutch politician of the Catholic People's Party (KVP) and Christian Democratic Appeal (CDA) party. He served as State Secretary for Economic Affairs from 11 May 1973 until 8 September 1977 in the Cabinet Den Uyl and from 28 December 1977 until 11 September 1981 in the Cabinet Van Agt–Wiegel, and as a Member of the House of Representatives from 26 October 1971 until 7 December 1972 and from 8 June 1977 until 28 December 1977.

== Decorations ==
Honours
Ribbon bar	Honour	Country	Date	Comment	Reference
	Commander of the Order of Orange-Nassau	Netherlands			

Political offices
Preceded by Jan Oostenbrink	State Secretary for Economic Affairs; 1973–1977; 1977–1981; Served alongside: Has Beyen (1978–1981)	Succeeded by Piet van Zeil; Wim Dik
