= Paulusma =

Paulusma is a Dutch patronymic surname. Notable people with the surname include:

- Jelle Paulusma (born 1965), Dutch songwriter, singer, and multi-instrumentalist who was with Daryll-Ann band in 1990s
- Polly Paulusma (born 1976), English singer-songwriter
- Wieke Paulusma (born 1978), Dutch politician
