= Piet van Zeil =

Dutch politician (1927–2012)

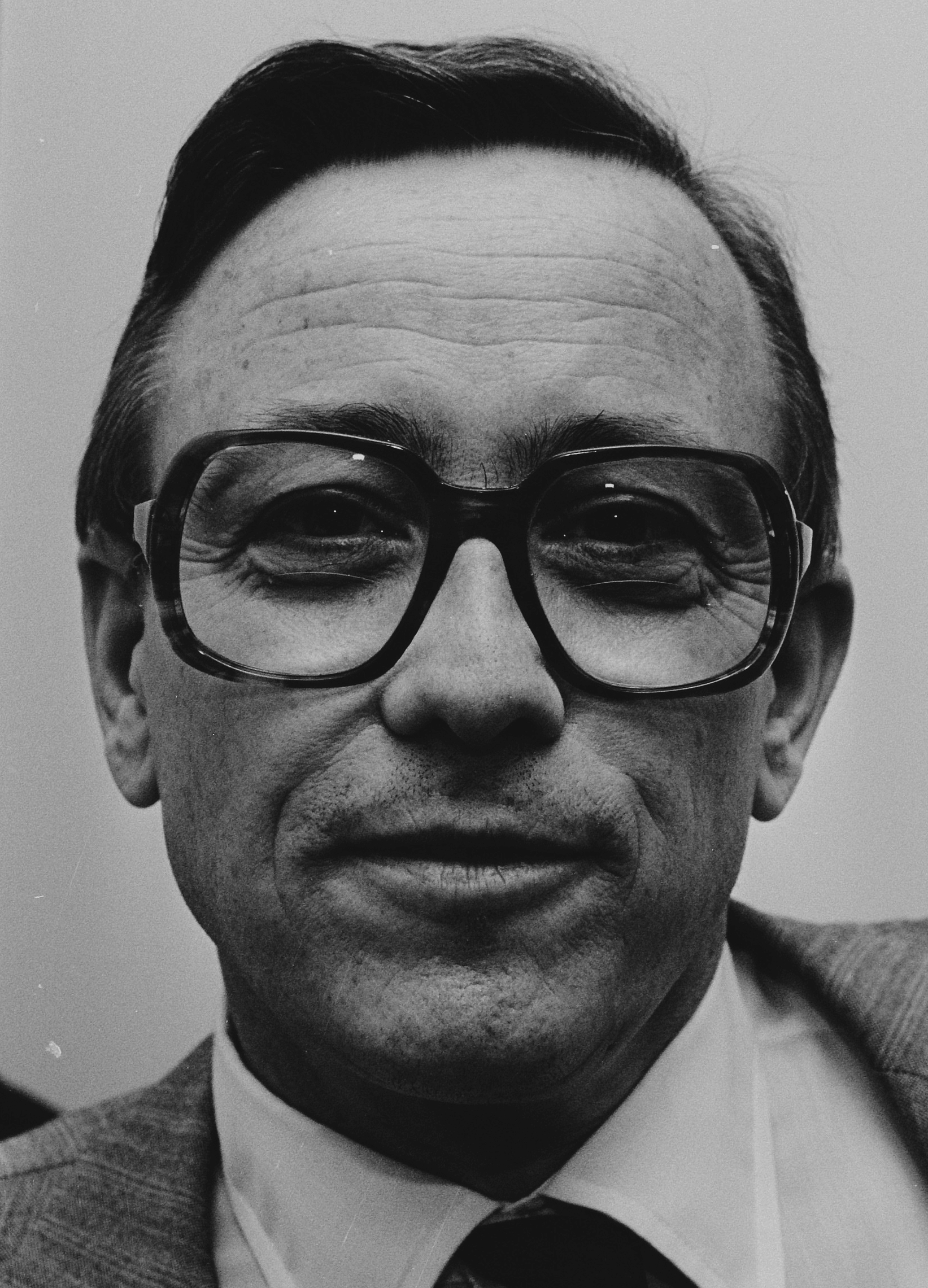
- Piet van Zeil in 1980

Mayor of Heerlen
- In office 1 July 1986 – 1 September 1992
- Preceded by: Jan Reijnen
- Succeeded by: Jef Pleumeekers

State Secretary of Social Affairs and Employment
- In office 12 June 1982 – 4 November 1982
- Prime Minister: Dries van Agt
- Preceded by: Ien Dales; Hedy d'Ancona
- Succeeded by: Louw de Graaf

State Secretary of Economic Affairs
- In office 11 September 1981 – 22 June 1986 Serving with Wim Dik (1981–1982); Frits Bolkestein (1982–1986)
- Prime Minister: Dries van Agt (1981–1982); Ruud Lubbers (1982–1986)
- Preceded by: Ted Hazekamp; Has Beyen
- Succeeded by: Frits Bolkestein

Chairman of the Catholic People's Party
- In office 5 April 1975 – 27 September 1980
- Leader: Frans Andriessen
- Preceded by: Dick de Zeeuw
- Succeeded by: Office discontinued

Member of the House of Representatives
- In office 3 June 1986 – 22 June 1986
- In office 16 September 1982 – 5 November 1982
- In office 1 February 1972 – 11 September 1981

Member of the Social and Economic Council
- In office 30 August 1968 – 1 February 1972
- Chairman: Jan de Pous

Personal details
- Born: Petrus Hendrikus van Zeil; 3 August 1927 Hillegom, Netherlands
- Died: 10 November 2012 (aged 85) Heerlen, Netherlands
- Party: Christian Democratic Appeal (from 1980)
- Other political affiliations: Catholic People's Party (until 1980)
- Spouse: Agnes de Groot (m. 1955)
- Occupation: Politician; Political consultant; Clerk; Corporate director; Nonprofit director; Trade Union leader

Petrus Hendrikus "Piet" van Zeil (3 August 1927 – 10 November 2012) was a Dutch politician of the Catholic People's Party (KVP) and later the Christian Democratic Appeal (CDA) party and trade union leader.

Van Zeil worked as an office clerk for Van Gend & Loos from April 1944 until May 1951 and as a trade union leader for the Dutch Confederation of Trade Unions (NVV) from May 1951 until February 1972, serving as General-Secretary from August 1968 until February 1972. Van Zeil served on the municipal council of Hillegom from April 1966 until May 1974.

Van Zeil became a member of the House of Representatives after Gerard Veringa was appointed as a member of the Council of State, taking office on 1 February 1972 serving as a frontbencher chairing the parliamentary committee for Kingdom Relations and spokesperson for transport, aviation, Kingdom relations and deputy spokesperson for social affairs. Van Zeil also served as Chairman of the Catholic People's Party from 5 April 1975 until 27 September 1980. After the 1981 general election, Van Zeil was appointed State Secretary of Economic Affairs in the Van Agt II cabinet, taking office on 11 September 1981. The cabinet fell just seven months into its term on 12 May 1982 after months of tensions in the coalition and continued to serve in a demissionary capacity until the first cabinet formation of 1982 when it was replaced by the caretaker Van Agt III cabinet, with Van Zeil continuing as State Secretary of Economic Affairs, taking office on 29 May 1982. Van Zeil was also appointed State Secretary of Social Affairs and Employment and dual served in those positions, taking office on 12 June 1982. After the 1982 general election, Van Zeil returned to the House of Representatives, taking office on 16 September 1982. Following the cabinet formation of 1982, Van Zeil continued as State Secretary of Economic Affairs in the Lubbers I cabinet, taking office on 5 November 1982. After the 1986 general election, Van Zeil again returned to the House of Representatives, taking office on 3 June 1986. Following the cabinet formation of 1986, Van Zeil per his own request was not considered for cabinet post in the new cabinet as he was nominated as mayor of Heerlen; he resigned as State Secretary of Economic Affairs and as a member of the House of Representatives on 22 June 1986 and was installed as mayor, serving from 1 July 1986 until 1 September 1992.

Van Zeil semi-retired after spending 20 years in national politics and became active in the private sector and public sector and occupied numerous seats as a corporate director and nonprofit director on several boards of directors and supervisory boards (Netherlands Bible Society, Transnational Institute, and the Catholic Scouts) and served on several state commissions and councils on behalf of the government (Cadastre Agency, Public Pension Funds PFZW and KPN).

Van Zeil was known for his abilities as a debater and negotiator. Van Zeil continued to comment on political affairs until his death at the age of 85.

== Decorations ==
Honours
Ribbon bar	Honour	Country	Date	Comment
	Commander of the Order of Leopold II	Belgium	12 February 1982	
	Officer of the Order of the Oak Crown	Luxembourg	30 July 1983	
	Officer of the Legion of Honour	France	15 November 1985	
	Officer of the Order of Merit	Germany	12 April 1986	
	Grand Officer of the Order of Orange-Nassau	Netherlands	26 August 1986	
	Knight of the Order of the Netherlands Lion	Netherlands	1 September 1992	
	Knight Commander of the Order of St. Gregory the Great	Holy See	15 May 1996	
	Knight Commander of the Order of the Holy Sepulchre	Holy See	1 April 2002	Elevated from Knight (12 July 1988)

Party political offices
Preceded by Dick de Zeeuw	Chairman of the Catholic People's Party; 1975–1980	Party merged into the Christian Democratic Appeal
Political offices
Preceded by Ted Hazekamp; Has Beyen	State Secretary of Economic Affairs; 1981–1986; With: Wim Dik (1981–1982); Frits Bolkestein (1982–1986)	Succeeded by Frits Bolkestein
Preceded by Ien Dales; Hedy d'Ancona	State Secretary of Social; Affairs and Employment; 1982	Succeeded by Louw de Graaf
Preceded by Jan Reijnen	Mayor of Heerlen; 1986–1992	Succeeded by Jef Pleumeekers
Civic offices
Unknown	Chairman of the supervisory board of the Cadastre Agency; 1994–1997	Unknown
Non-profit organization positions
Unknown	General-Secretary of the Dutch Confederation of Trade Unions; 1968–1972	Unknown
