= Has Beyen =

Dutch banker and politician (1923-2002)

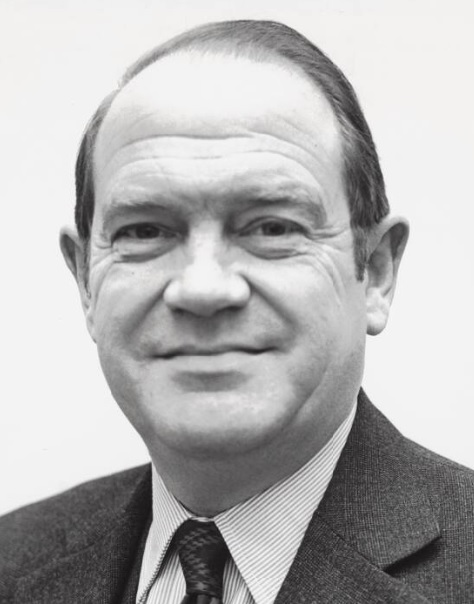
- Beyen in 1978

State Secretary for Economic Affairs
- In office 9 January 1978 – 11 September 1981
- Prime Minister: Dries van Agt
- Minister: Gijs van Aardenne
- Preceded by: Ted Hazekamp
- Succeeded by: Piet van Zeil; Wim Dik

Personal details
- Born: Karel Herman Beyen; 22 March 1923 The Hague, Netherlands
- Died: 2 January 2002 (aged 78) Wassenaar, Netherlands
- Party: People's Party for Freedom and Democracy
- Spouses: Sally Brunet (m. 1954; died 1976); Willemijn Brom (m. 1979)
- Children: Wim Beyen (1955-1998)
- Parents: Johan Beyen (father); Petronella Hijmans van Anrooij (mother)
- Occupation: Banker, politician

Karel Herman "Has" Beyen (22 March 1923 – 2 January 2002) was a Dutch banker and politician for the People's Party for Freedom and Democracy (VVD).

Political offices
Preceded by Ted Hazekamp	State Secretary for Economic Affairs; 1978–1981	Succeeded by Piet van Zeil; Wim Dik
