= Dirk Beljaarts =

Dutch politician (born 1978)

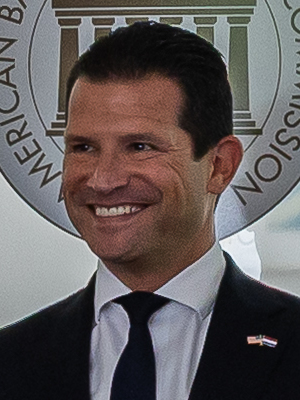
- Beljaarts in 2025

Minister of Economic Affairs
- In office 2 July 2024 – 3 June 2025
- Prime Minister: Dick Schoof
- Preceded by: Micky Adriaansens (Economic Affairs and Climate Policy)
- Succeeded by: Vincent Karremans

Honorary Consul of Hungary in Amsterdam
- In office 2015–2024

Personal details
- Born: Dirk Stefan Beljaarts; 8 February 1978 (age 48) Roosendaal, Netherlands
- Citizenship: Netherlands; Hungary (1978–2024)
- Party: Party for Freedom
- Occupation: Politician; lobbyist; hotelier

Dirk Stefan Beljaarts (Dutch: [ˈdɪr(ə)ɡ ˈbɛljaːrts]; born 8 February 1978) is a Dutch hotelier, lobbyist, and politician of the right-wing populist Party for Freedom (PVV). He served as Minister of Economic Affairs in the Schoof cabinet from July 2024 to June 2025.

== Early life and hospitality career ==
Beljaarts was born in Roosendaal, and he studied at the Maastricht Hotel Management School. He became hotel manager of the Loosdrecht location of the Golden Tulip chain in 2007. He later headed several more Golden Tulip locations in the Netherlands and Germany as well as the Amsterdam art'otel and Novotel.

Starting in 2019, he served as general director of Royal Hospitality Netherlands (KHN), a trade association of the hospitality industry. When the sector was impacted by measures to combat the COVID-19 pandemic such as lockdowns, Beljaarts called them disproportionate.

A subsidiary bookkeeping firm offering services to hospitality businesses was established under his leadership, and Beljaarts served as co-director. After its bankruptcy in May 2023, the trustee announced an investigation into charges for unperformed services. During his cabinet confirmation hearing, Beljaarts declared that he had been a non-executive director until January 2023 and that a criminal complaint had only been filed against the other co-director. Beljaarts announced in early 2024 that he would vacate his position at KHN. de Volkskrant later reported that the association's members council had asked him to resign, partly because of the bankruptcy. Beljaarts held secondary positions as member of the Social and Economic Council starting in 2019 and as member of the Frans Hals Museum's advisory board.

== Minister of Economic Affairs ==
After the PVV, VVD, NSC, and BBB formed the Schoof cabinet, Beljaarts was sworn in as Minister of Economic Affairs on 2 July 2024. Climate policy was simultaneously spun off from the ministry into the Ministry of Climate Policy and Green Growth. Following a request from PostNL, Beljaarts announced a bill to extend the maximum delivery time for personal mail from 24 to 48 hours, with the exception of medical and condolence mail. Due to significant opposition in the House of Representatives, he promised to postpone legislation until after an investigation by the Netherlands Authority for Consumers and Markets (ACM).

Beljaarts championed efforts to expand the semiconductor industry in the European Union (EU), as the Netherlands already housed photolithography machine producer ASML. He argued that moving the last part of the industry's value chain from China to Europe would increase supply chain resilience.

On 3 June 2025, Beljaarts resigned following the PVV withdrawing from the government coalition. Finance Minister Eelco Heinen was appointed ad interim Minister of Economic Affairs.

== Personal life ==
Beljaarts has a Hungarian mother, and he initiated a procedure to renounce his Hungarian citizenship upon his ministerial appointment. He was an honorary consul of the country between 2015 and 2024.

Political offices
Preceded by Micky Adriaansens	Minister of Economic Affairs; 2024–2025	Succeeded by Vincent Karremans
