= Micky Adriaansens =

Dutch politician (born 1964)

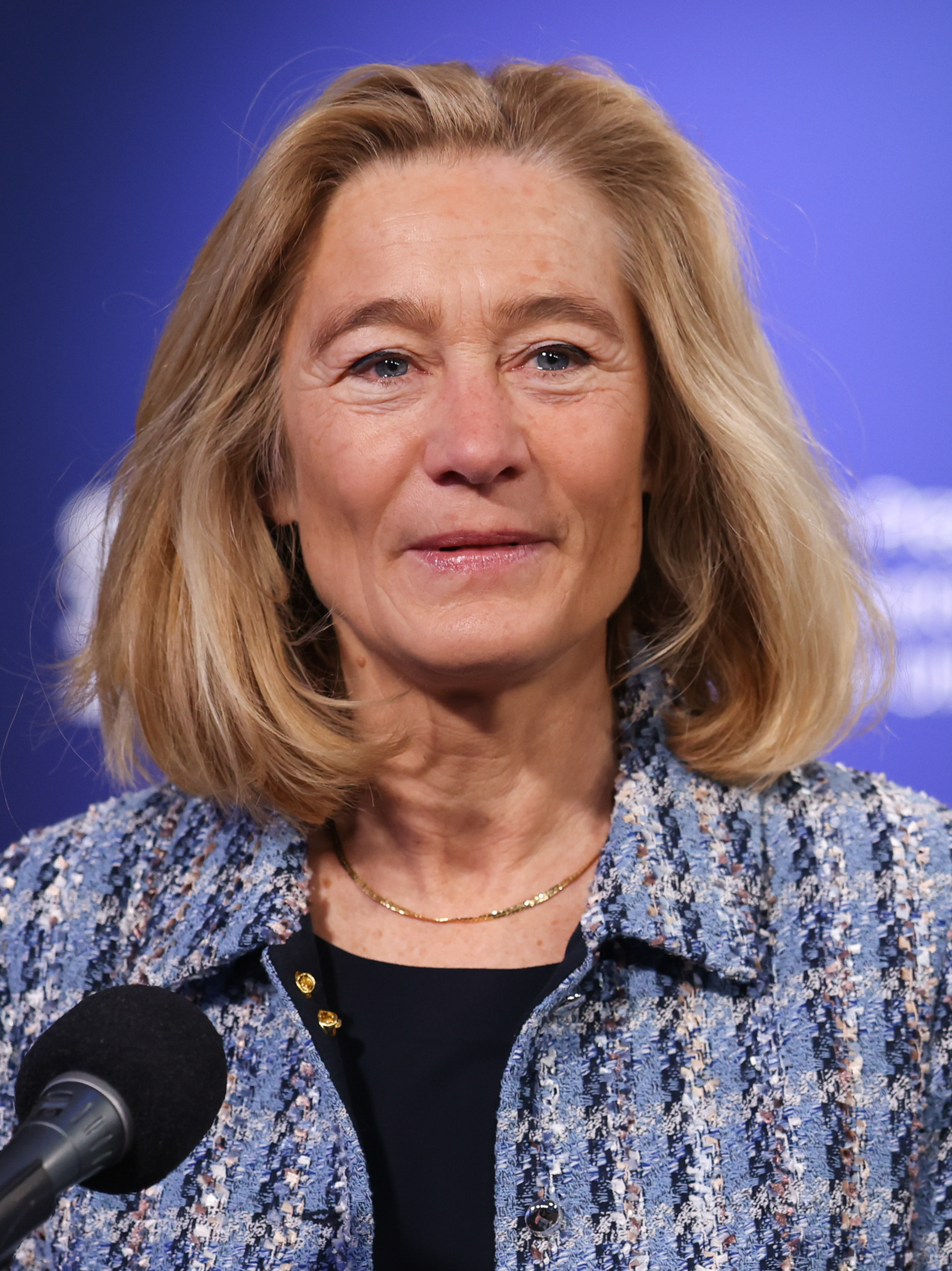
- Adriaansens in 2023

Minister of Economic Affairs and Climate Policy
- In office 10 January 2022 – 2 July 2024
- Prime Minister: Mark Rutte
- Preceded by: Stef Blok
- Succeeded by: Dirk Beljaarts (as Minister of Economic Affairs); Sophie Hermans (as Minister of Climate Policy and Green Growth)

Senator of the Netherlands
- In office 11 June 2019 – 10 January 2022

Personal details
- Born: 1 March 1964 (age 62) Schiedam, Netherlands
- Party: People's Party for Freedom and Democracy

Monique Anne Maria "Micky" Adriaansens (born 1 March 1964) is a Dutch politician, lawyer and administrator who served as Minister of Economic Affairs and Climate Policy in the fourth Rutte cabinet from January 2022 until July 2024. A member of the People's Party for Freedom and Democracy (VVD), she was previously a member of the Senate (2019–2022).

== Career ==
A native of Schiedam, Adriaansens attended the Municipal Gymnasium in Hilversum. She studied Law, Health Policy and Management at the Erasmus University in Rotterdam. During her studies, she was active in the Hermes House Band.

She then worked for the law firm AKD in bankruptcy law. Between 1999 and 2003 Adriaansens worked as a consultant at Twynstra Gudde, before she became active as a health care administrator. On 1 June 2016, she returned to Twynstra Gudde where she became chairwoman of the board of directors. During her time in the private sector, she also held various supervisory directorships.

She was president of the Larensche Mixed Hockey Club (2012–2017), which she helped out of debt. She received the municipal medal of honour from the municipality of Laren for this in 2017; she was appointed an honorary member of the club in 2018.

She was a member of the Senate from June 2019 to January 2022, and she served as chair of the permanent Committee on Health, Welfare and Sport. In the latter month, Adriaansens was appointed Minister of Economic Affairs and Climate Policy in the Fourth Rutte cabinet. Her term ended on 2 July 2024, when the Schoof cabinet was sworn in. In February 2025, she became chair of Nyenrode Business University.

== Honours ==
- Spain: Grand Cross of the Order of Civil Merit (9 April 2024)
