= Wieke Paulusma =

Dutch politician

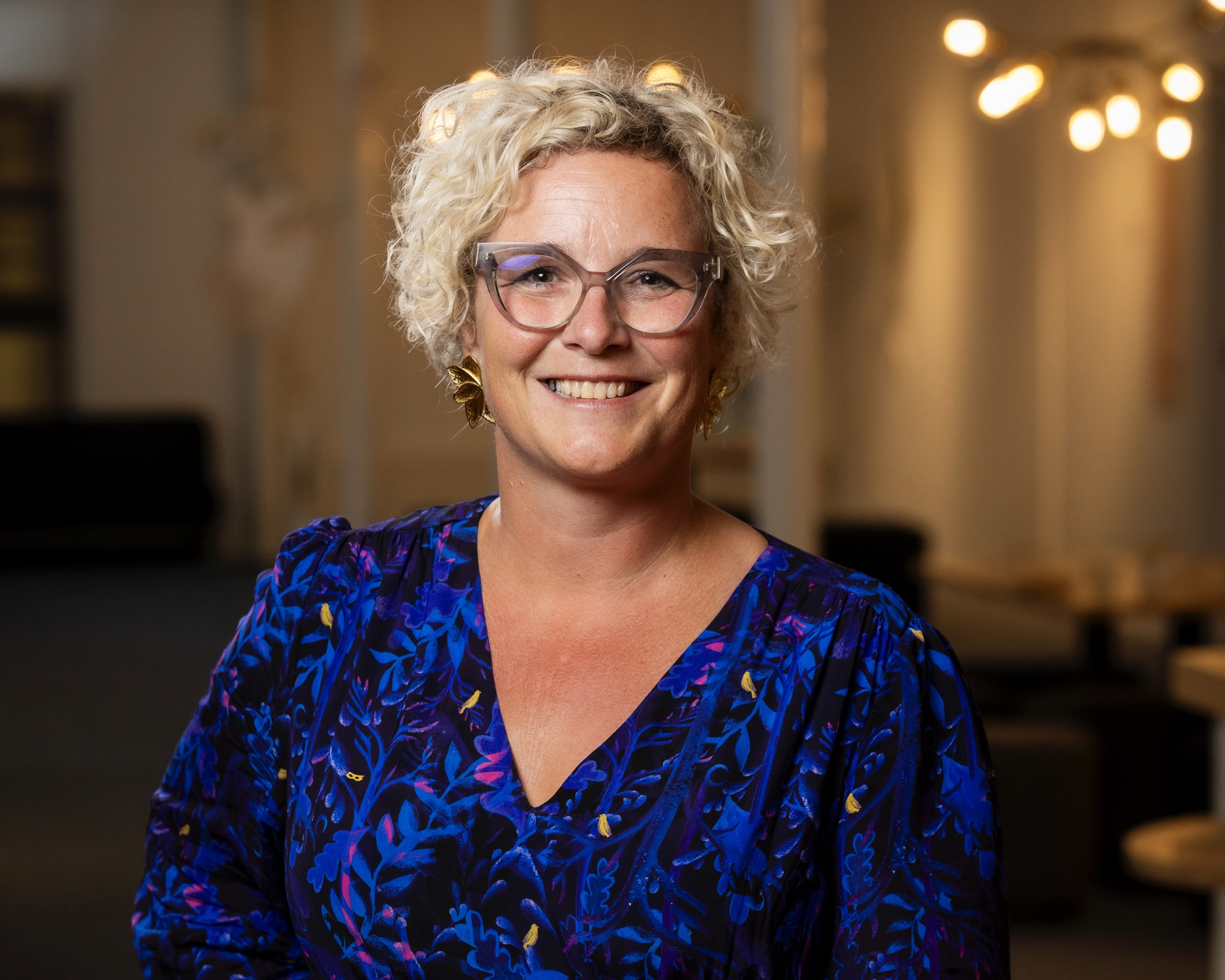
- Paulusma in 2026

First Deputy Speaker of the House of Representatives
- Incumbent
- Assumed office 20 November 2025
- Preceded by: Thom van Campen

Member of the House of Representatives
- Incumbent
- Assumed office 15 April 2021

Member of the Groningen municipal council
- In office 27 March 2014 – 28 April 2021
- Succeeded by: Sander Claassen

Personal details
- Born: 5 December 1978 (age 47) Emmen, Netherlands
- Party: Democrats 66 (D66)
- Children: 2
- Education: Hanze University of Applied Sciences; HU University of Applied Sciences Utrecht
- Occupation: Politician; nurse; health care manager

Wieke Paulusma (born 5 December 1978) is a Dutch health professional and politician for the social liberal party Democrats 66 (D66), who has been serving as a member of the House of Representatives since the 2021 general election. She started her career as a nurse and also worked as a health care manager. Besides, Paulusma served on the Groningen municipal council between 2014 and 2021.

== Early life and career ==
Paulusma was born in 1978 in Emmen, a city in the province of Drenthe, and grew up in the nearby village of Odoorn. Her parents were teachers, and they raised her in the West Frisian language. Paulusma has two younger brothers, and the family attended a Reformed Protestant church. She attended the secondary school Hondrus College in Emmen at vwo level and subsequently studied at the School of Nursing, part of the Groningen Hanze University of Applied Sciences. Paulusma was also trained in nursing at the HU University of Applied Sciences Utrecht.

She started her career as a district nurse for Thuiszorg Groningen, working there between 2003 and 2007. Paulusma then served as a partner at MAD Multimedia and a senior account manager at Storm Marketing Consultants. She returned to health care in 2011, working as manager at Thuiszorg Icare, and became a manager at the University Medical Center Groningen (UMCG) in 2013. She worked as a manager and project leader at Treant Zorggroep in 2017 before becoming a district nurse again the following year at TSN Thuiszorg. Between 2019 and her election to the House in 2021, she was a program manager at Ommelander Hospital and the UMCG.

Besides her job, Paulusma has also been serving as the chair of the board of directors of the International Film Festival Assen (IFA) since 2019 and as the secretary of the three-person board of directors of Stichting Lutje Geluk, which makes it possible for financially strained families to go on trips, since its formation in 2018.

== Groningen municipal council (2014–2021) ==
She was inspired to go into politics by Els Borst, D66 leader and Ministers of Health, Welfare, and Sport, and joined D66 in 2012. Paulusma was elected to the Groningen municipal council in the 2014 municipal elections as D66's eighth candidate. She had decided to run for office because municipalities had been given more health care responsibilities, and she therefore deemed it necessary for people with experience in that field to be in the municipal council. Paulusma was one of the organizers of a G1000 conference, which was held in Groningen in June 2015. The conference about the city's future was attended by over 500 citizens, who had been chosen through a lottery, and it followed the concept of other G1000 conferences that had been held in Belgium and the Netherlands. Paulusma was also one of the initiators of a cooperative district council with members chosen through a lottery in her own district, the Oosterparkwijk. She had been inspired by a similar council in the London Borough of Lambeth. In the municipal council, she proposed making it possible for citizens to retrieve the municipality's file of them online. She also advocated banning smoking in places such as playgrounds and schools.

Paulusma was re-elected in November 2018 as D66's second candidate. Her new specialties in the council included health care, welfare, local democracy, safety, and diversity. She also helped organize the campaign Raad zoekt Vrouw (Council is looking for women) to get more women elected to the Groningen council, for which she received the 2017 inspiration award from D66's Els Borst Netwerk. Paulusma also won the European Innovation in Politics Award for Democracy in 2019 for her work on the cooperative district council. She left the municipal council in April 2021 after her election to the House of Representatives.

While a councilor, Paulusma served as chair of D66's national thematic department Care and Welfare, as a board member of the Association of Netherlands Municipalities (VNG; 2016–2021), and as a board member of the Els Borst Netwerk, which promotes gender equality within D66.

== House of Representatives ==
She ran for member of parliament in the 2021 general election, being placed fifteenth on D66's party list. Paulusma was elected and received 14,933 preference votes. She tested positive for the coronavirus on 30 March, causing her to miss the swearing in of the new House of Representatives the following day. Paulusma was eventually installed on 15 April. Paulusma became her party's spokesperson for curative care, mental health care, assisted living for people with psychological and psychosocial issues, caregivers, medicine, and war victims.

In the House, she drew attention to long COVID, a condition from which she was suffering as a result of her coronavirus infection, and offered an action plan to Minister for Medical Care Tamara van Ark. Following the swearing in of the fourth Rutte cabinet in January 2022, her specialties changed to the coronavirus, curative care, and medicine. She defended her party's position to keep open the option of instating a 2G policy, under which only vaccinated or recovered people are allowed to enter certain places, to fight the COVID-19 pandemic. Paulusma complained about the hatred, sexism, and accusations she was experiencing since taking on the COVID-19 portfolio, and months later a man was sentenced to one month in prison after making threats against her as well as an acting mayor and two police officers. When the health minister was considering closing two of the four locations in the Netherlands for pediatric heart surgery for the sake of centralization, Paulusma filed a motion in February 2022 to force the investigation to take regional spread into account. It was supported by a majority of the House. Another motion of Paulusma was carried to send free self-tests to women to detect the human papillomavirus (HPV), which can lead to cervical cancer. This was in response to decreasing turn-out during screenings for the virus. The self-tests had earlier only been available upon request.

Following her November 2023 re-election, Paulusma's portfolio changed to healthcare, sport, child services, and poverty. She led D66's campaign during the May 2024 European Parliament election. A motion by Paulusma was passed in September 2024 calling on the government to donate 13,200 of its 100,000 mpox vaccines to African countries in response to the an epidemic. Minister Fleur Agema had ignored her ministry's advice to that effect, but she announced that she would comply following the motion. Together with Judith Tielen (VVD), she presented a bill which would compel day care centers to refuse admission to children not participating in the National Immunisation Programme if the national vaccination rate is below 92%.

=== Committee assignments ===
==== 2021–2023 term ====
- Committee for Kingdom Relations (chair)
- Committee for Health, Welfare and Sport

==== 2023–present term ====
- Presidium (Fourth Deputy Speaker)
- Committee for Social Affairs and Employment
- Committee for Health, Welfare and Sport

== Personal life ==
Paulusma lives in the city of Groningen. She has a husband, and they have a son and a daughter. She has described herself as a non-believer.

== Electoral history ==
Electoral history of Wieke Paulusma
Year	Body	Party	Pos.	Votes	Result		Ref.
Year	Body	Party	Pos.	Votes	Party seats	Individual	Ref.
2021	House of Representatives	Democrats 66	15	14,933	24	Won	
2023	House of Representatives	Democrats 66	7	12,771	9	Won	
2025	House of Representatives	Democrats 66	7	47,800	26	Won	
