= Vincent Karremans =

Dutch politician (born 1986)

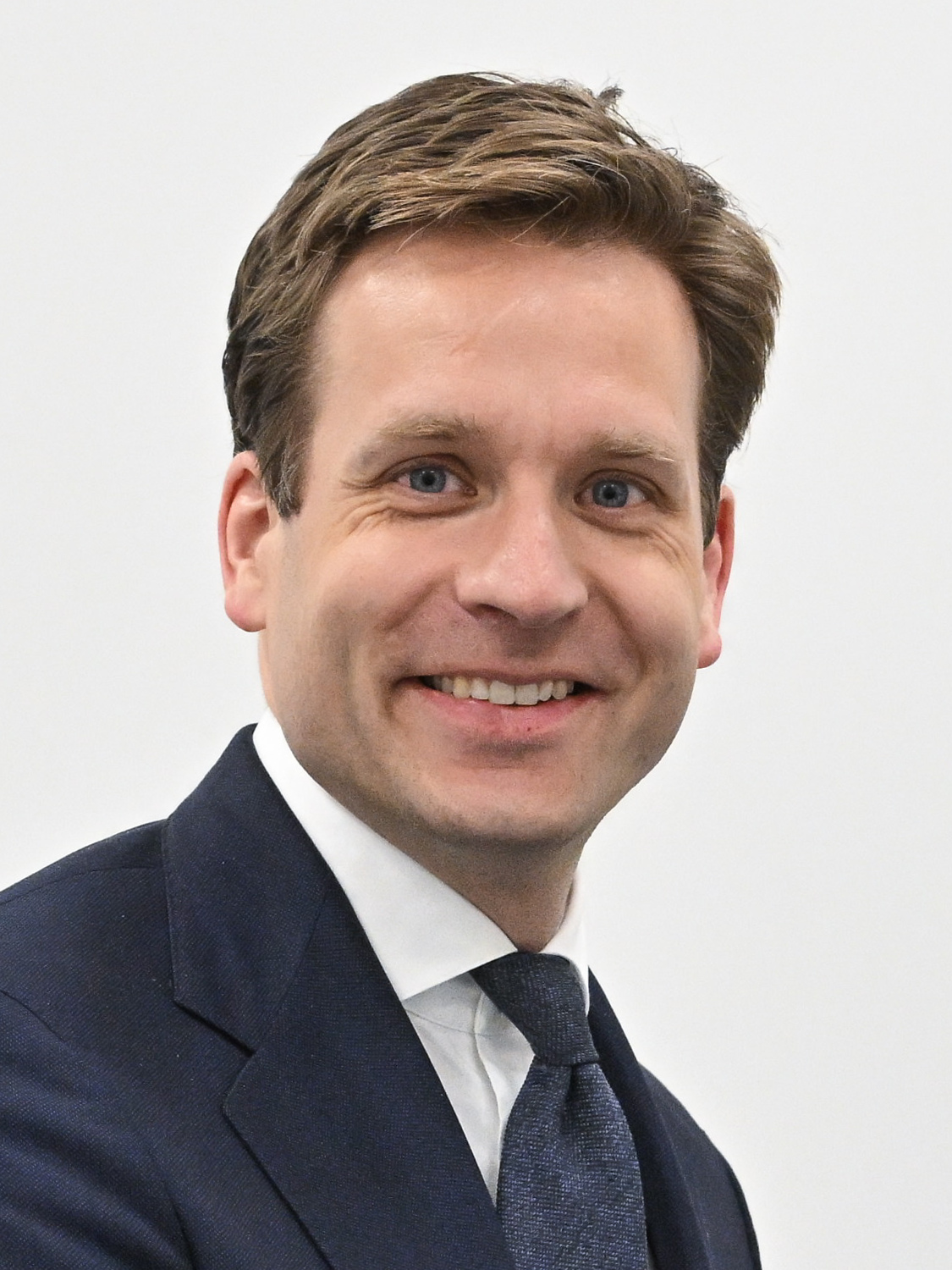
- Karremans in 2025

Minister of Infrastructure and Water Management
- Incumbent
- Assumed office 23 February 2026
- Prime Minister: Rob Jetten
- Preceded by: Robert Tieman

Minister of Economic Affairs
- In office 19 June 2025 – 23 February 2026
- Prime Minister: Dick Schoof
- Preceded by: Dirk Beljaarts
- Succeeded by: Heleen Herbert

State Secretary for Youth, Prevention and Sport
- In office 2 July 2024 – 19 June 2025
- Prime Minister: Dick Schoof
- Minister: Fleur Agema
- Preceded by: Maarten van Ooijen
- Succeeded by: Judith Tielen

Member of the House of Representatives
- In office 12 November 2025 – 23 February 2026

Alderman of Rotterdam
- In office 2 September 2021 – 1 July 2024

Member of the Rotterdam Municipal Council
- In office 29 March 2018 – 2 September 2021

Personal details
- Born: Vincent Pieter Geert Karremans; 12 November 1986 (age 39) The Hague, Netherlands
- Party: People's Party for Freedom and Democracy
- Children: 3
- Education: Erasmus University Rotterdam
- Occupation: Entrepreneur; Politician

Vincent Pieter Geert Karremans (Dutch: [ˈvɪnsɛnt ˈkɑrəmɑns]; born 12 November 1986) is a Dutch politician serving as the minister of infrastructure and water management since February 2026. A member of the People's Party for Freedom and Democracy (VVD), he served as the minister of economic affairs from June 2025 to 2026 and previously as state secretary for youth, prevention and sport from July 2024 to June 2025.

== Early life and career ==
A native of The Hague, Karremans was raised in neighbouring Wassenaar. His mother died when he was 16 years old. He studied financial economics and corporate law at Erasmus University Rotterdam. As a student, he founded a business called Magnet.me, connecting companies with potential employees.

== Politics ==
Karremans was elected to the municipal council of Rotterdam in 2018 as the VVD's lead candidate. He drew attention during the campaign by appearing shirtless on a horse in a campaign video as a parody of US political ads. The second-largest party in the council, the VVD formed a coalition government with five other parties, bypassing plurality-party Livable Rotterdam. Karremans served as the VVD's leader in the council until he was appointed an alderman in the municipal executive in 2021. He starred in a campaign video inspired by movies produced by Marvel Studios ahead of the 2022 municipal election, after which he stayed on as the alderman tasked with enforcement, outdoor space, and mobility. During his term, he decided in favour of the construction of a third bridge across the Nieuwe Maas.

After the PVV, VVD, NSC, and BBB formed the Schoof cabinet, Karremans was sworn in as State Secretary for Youth, Prevention and Sport on 2 July 2024. His portfolio included medical ethics, World War II veterans, healthcare in the Dutch Caribbean, youth, preventive healthcare, narcotics, sports, mental healthcare, COVID-19, Municipal Health Services, suicide prevention, sustainable healthcare, and food and product safety. Karremans continued his predecessor's efforts to curb rising youth care costs. He called for a greater societal role in addressing minor issues, suggesting it could ease waiting lists for children with complex needs. As an initial goal, he sought to reduce the proportion of children receiving support from one in seven to one in ten. During Karremans's term, vaccination against respiratory syncytial virus was added to the free National Immunisation Programme.

Following the PVV leaving the coalition government and the resignation of Economic Affairs Minister Dirk Beljaarts, Karremans was appointed to succeed him on 19 June 2025.

== Personal life ==
Karremans is married, and has three children.

Political offices
Preceded by Maarten van Ooijen	State Secretary for Youth, Prevention and Sport; 2024–2025	Succeeded by Judith Tielen
Preceded by Dirk Beljaarts	Minister of Economic Affairs; 2025–2026	Succeeded by Heleen Herbert
Preceded by Robert Tieman	Minister of Infrastructure and Water Management; 2026–present	Incumbent
