= Robert Tieman =

Dutch politician (born 1976)

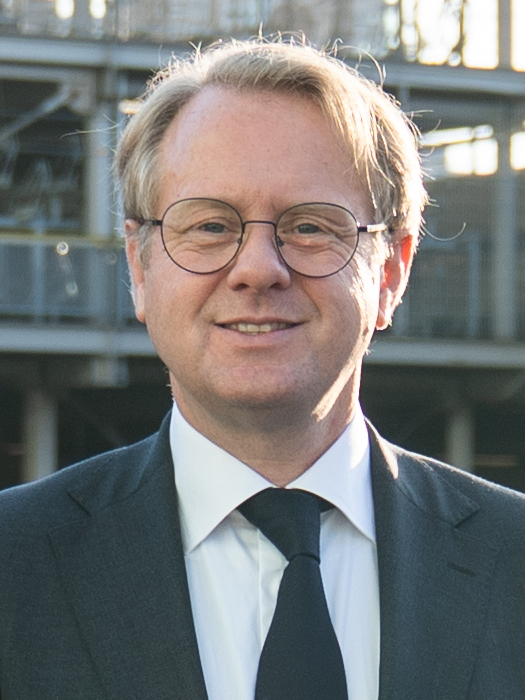
- Tieman in 2025

Minister of Infrastructure and Water Management
- In office 19 June 2025 – 23 February 2026
- Prime Minister: Dick Schoof
- Preceded by: Barry Madlener
- Succeeded by: Vincent Karremans

Member of the Hoogheemraadschap van Delfland
- In office 15 March 2023 – 19 June 2025

Personal details
- Born: 17 May 1976 (age 50) Leiderdorp, Netherlands
- Party: Farmer–Citizen Movement
- Children: 1
- Education: Amsterdam University of Applied Sciences

Robert Tieman (born 17 May 1976) is a Dutch politician for the Farmer-Citizen Movement (BBB) who served as Minister of Infrastructure and Water Management between June 2025 and February 2026.

Previously, he was public affairs manager at the employers' organization VNO-NCW and manager at a chemical company and daily manager at the Delfland Water Board. On 12 June 2025, it was announced that Tieman is the intended Minister of Infrastructure and Water Management in the outgoing Schoof cabinet.
