= Jan Oostenbrink =

Dutch politician (1936-2025)

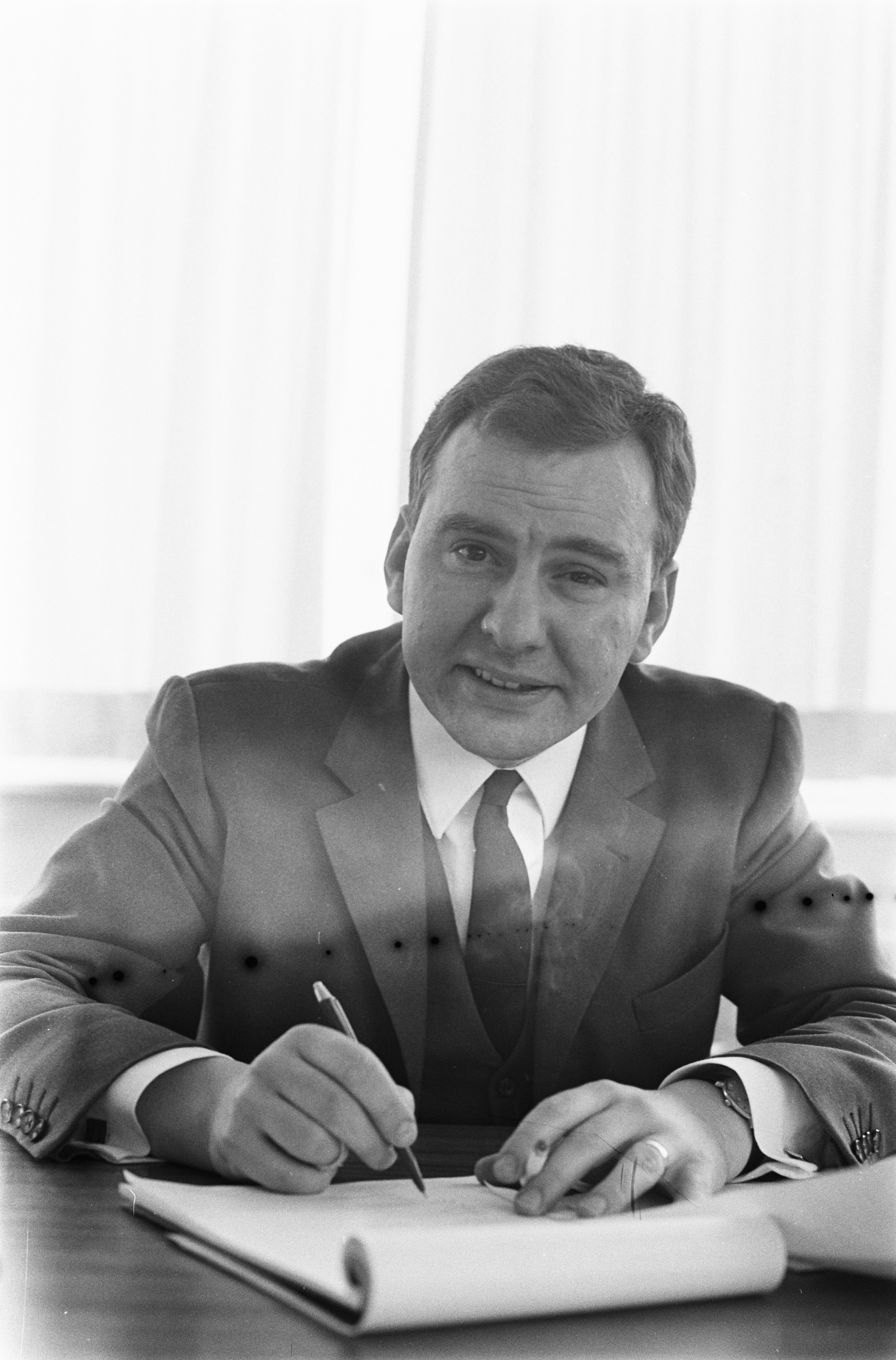
- Oostenbrink in 1969

State Secretary for Economic Affairs
- In office 6 July 1971 – 9 August 1972
- Prime Minister: Barend Biesheuvel
- Minister: Harrie Langman
- Preceded by: Louis van Son
- Succeeded by: Himself
- In office 9 August 1972 – 11 May 1973
- Prime Minister: Barend Biesheuvel
- Minister: Harrie Langman
- Preceded by: Himself
- Succeeded by: Ted Hazekamp

Personal details
- Born: Johannes Jacobus Marinus Oostenbrink; 18 August 1936 Amsterdam, Netherlands
- Died: 27 September 2025 (aged 89) Heemstede, Netherlands
- Party: Catholic People's Party
- Occupation: Politician

Johannes Jacobus Marinus "Jan" Oostenbrink (18 August 1936 – 27 September 2025) was a Dutch politician of the Catholic People's Party (KVP).

== Decorations ==
Honours
Ribbon bar	Honour	Country	Date	Comment
	Knight of the Order of the Netherlands Lion	Netherlands	8 June 1973	

Political offices
Preceded by Louis van Son	State Secretary for Economic Affairs; 1971–1972	Succeeded by Himself
Preceded by Himself	State Secretary for Economic Affairs; 1972–1973	Succeeded by Ted Hazekamp
