= Ronny Naftaniel =

Dutch activist (born 1948)

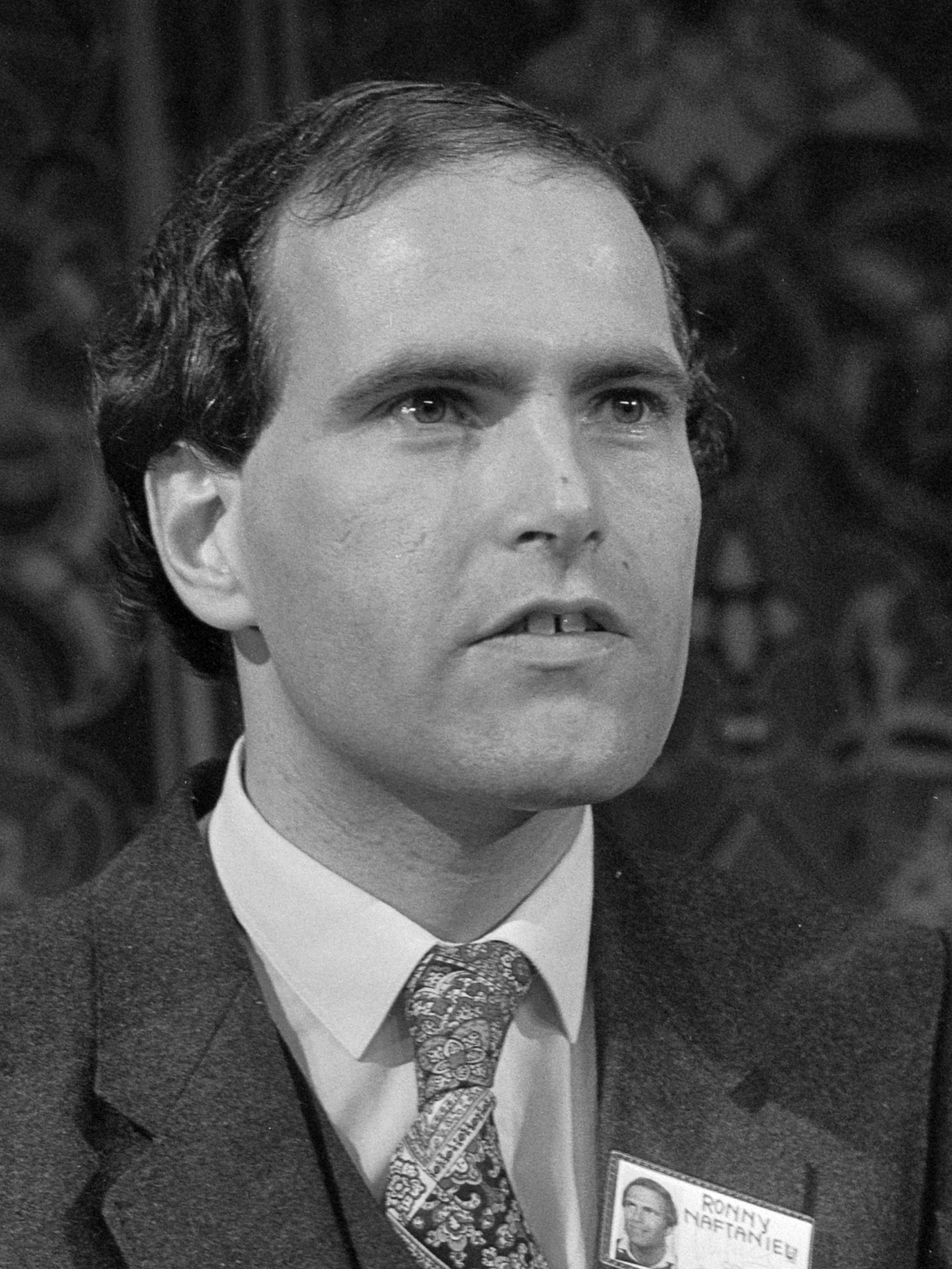
Naftaniel in 1982

Ronald Maurice (Ronny) Naftaniel (born October 10, 1948 in Amsterdam) is the former director of the Center for Information and Documentation Israel (Centrum Informatie en Documentatie Israël) (CIDI), in The Hague, The Netherlands, having served in this role from 1980 to 2013.

== Life ==
Ronny Naftaniel is the son of a German Jew who had survived the Holocaust in the Netherlands after already having fled Nazi Germany in the aftermath of Kristallnacht in 1938. Naftaniel's father was immediately interned in Westerbork - in 1938 a refugee camp where Jews from Germany who had fled Nazi Germany were brought to - after crossing the border with the Netherlands. During the Nazi occupation of the Netherlands, he succeeded in preventing his own deportation to the death camps in occupied Poland. He was liberated by Canadian forces in 1945 while still being held in Westerbork, which had been transformed into a transit camp for more than 100,000 Dutch Jews to Auschwitz, Sobibor, Bergen-Belsen and Theresienstadt by the Nazis.

Ronny Naftaniel grew up in a liberal Jewish family that had little to do with the religious side of Judaism. In the 1960s, Naftaniel developed a particular interest in politics, especially in the left-wing Pacifist Socialist Party.

In the 1970s, Naftaniel started to change under the influence of the 1973 oil crisis and increasing criticism on Israel and its actions within Dutch society. Becoming more and more aware of his Jewish identity, Naftaniel joined CIDI, the Center for Information and Documentation Israel in 1976. CIDI was found in 1974 by Bob Levisson (just like Ronny Naftaniel's father also a survivor of Westerbork) with the goal of promoting a positive view on Israel and counter increasing criticism of Israel within Dutch society.

Naftaniel became director of CIDI in 1980, succeeding Levisson. Since then, he has become a well-known figure, both within as well as outside the Dutch Jewish community. Eventually, during his 26 years as director, he became the face of CIDI. Praised by some, he is cursed by others. Under Naftaniel, CIDI has expanded its task to monitoring anti-Semitism in the Netherlands, besides challenging criticism of Israel. He is also a Board Member of the Brussels-based organization CEJI - A Jewish Contribution to an Inclusive Europe.

In 2024, he canceled his membership of the Dutch Labour Party after nearly fifty years. He was discontent with the party's condemnation of President of Israel Isaac Herzog's attending the opening ceremony of the Dutch National Holocaust Museum, which had sparked protests due to his connection to the Gaza war. Naftaniel deemed it unacceptable that the president of the Jewish state would be unwelcome, and he called Palestinian civilian casualties a logical consequence of the war.
