= Tourism in the Netherlands =

Top tourist attractions in the Netherlands

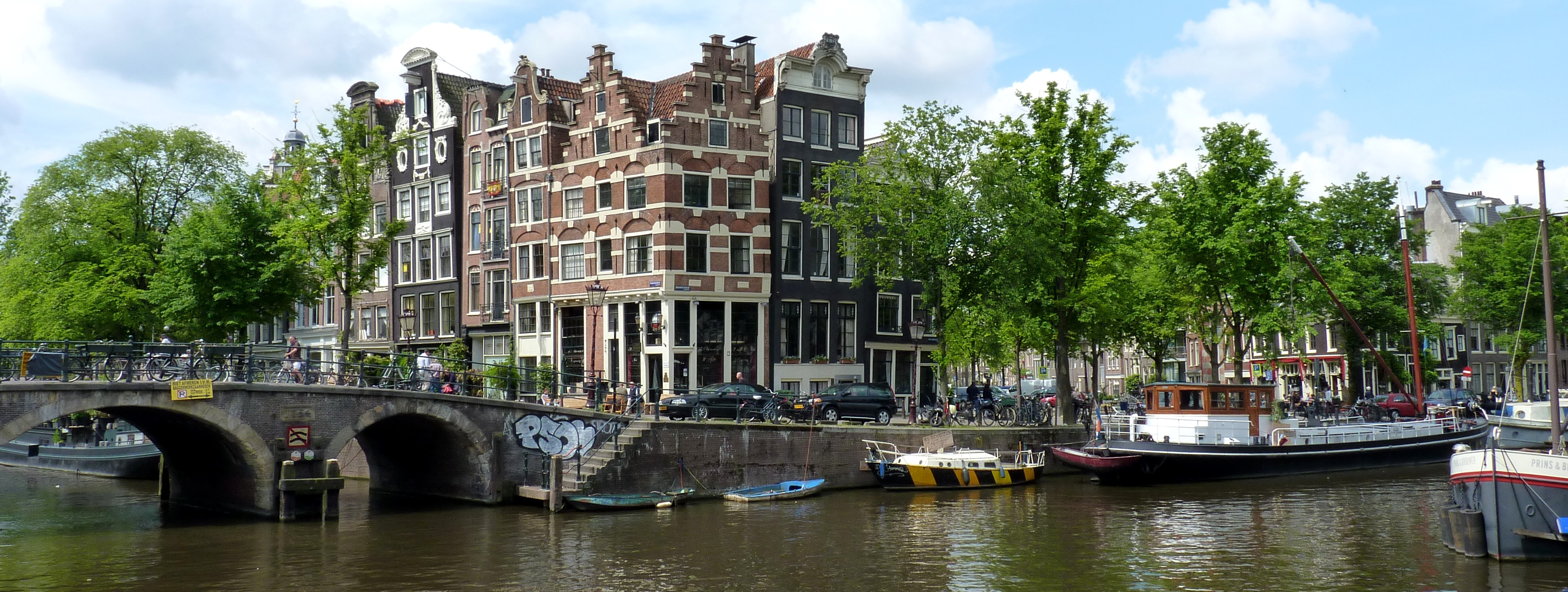
Amsterdam

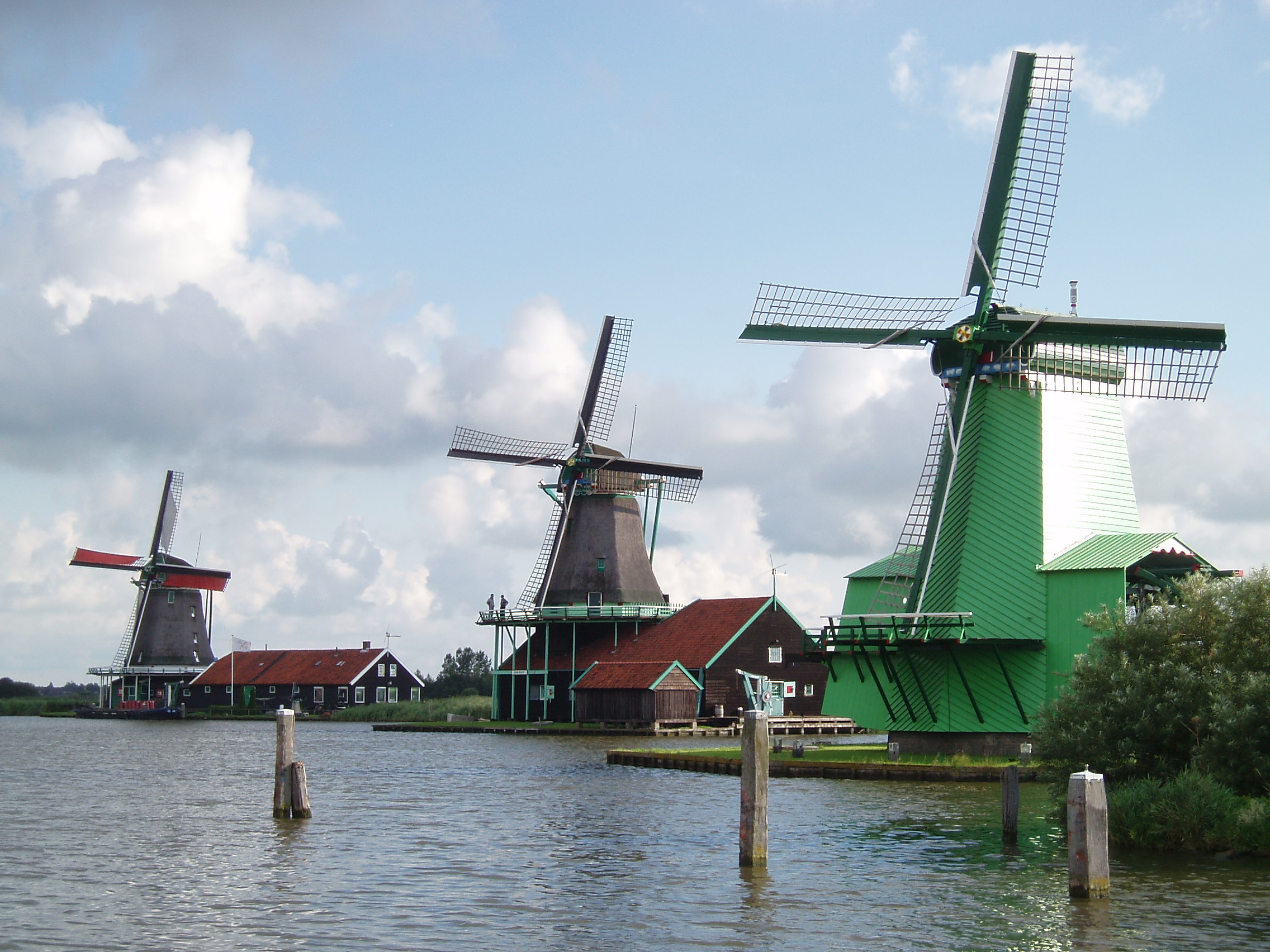
Zaanse Schans

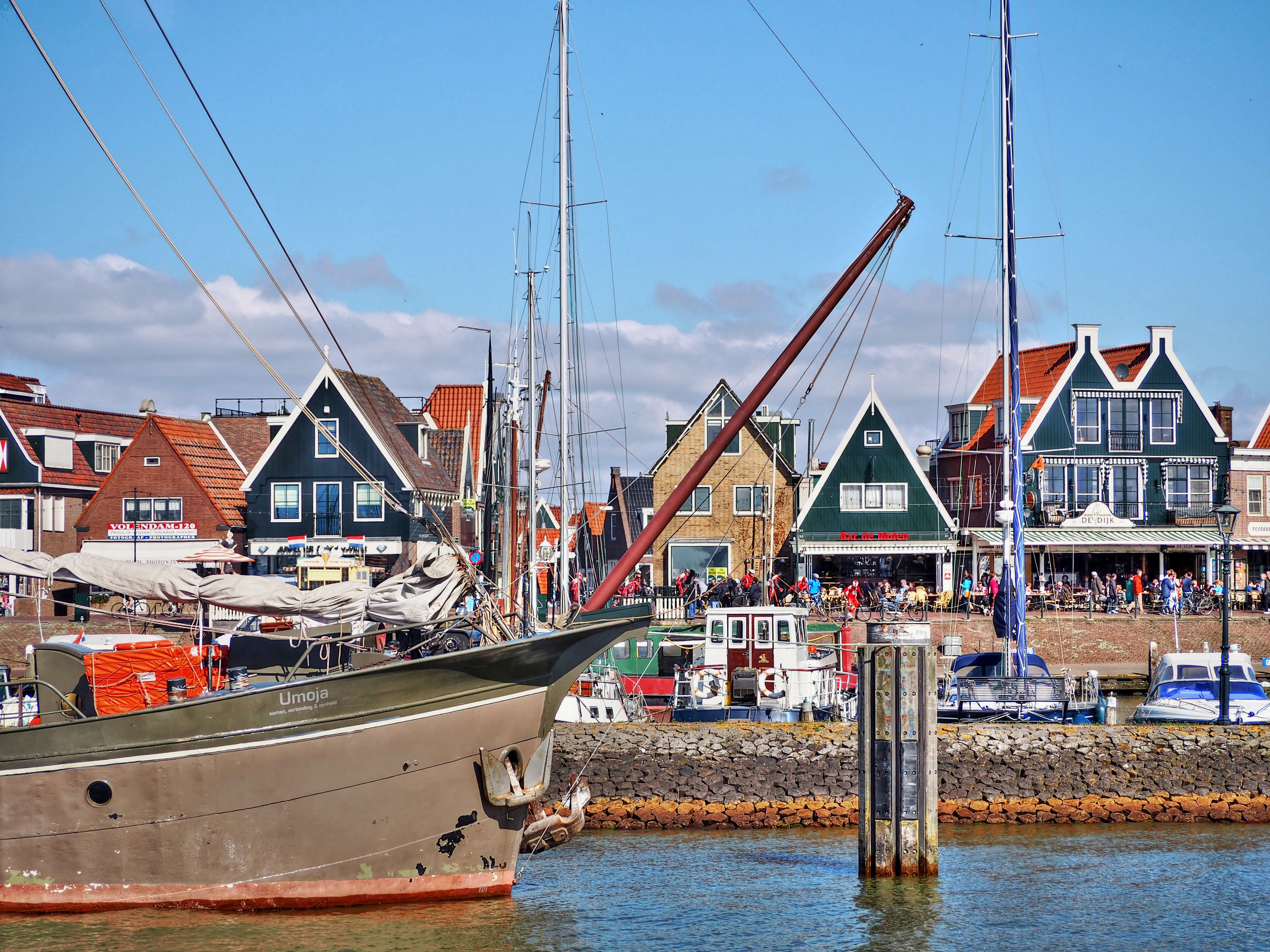
Volendam

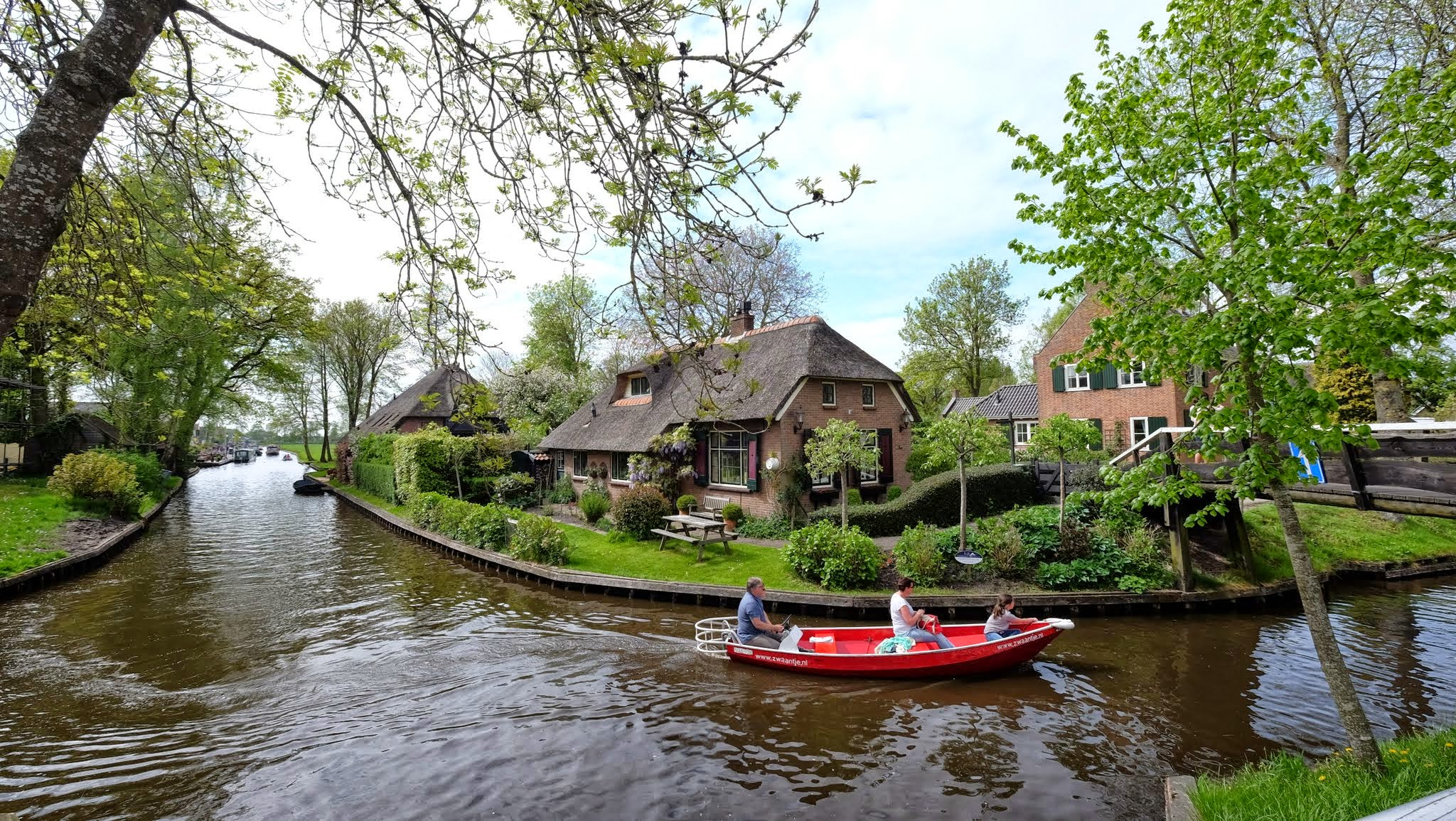
Giethoorn

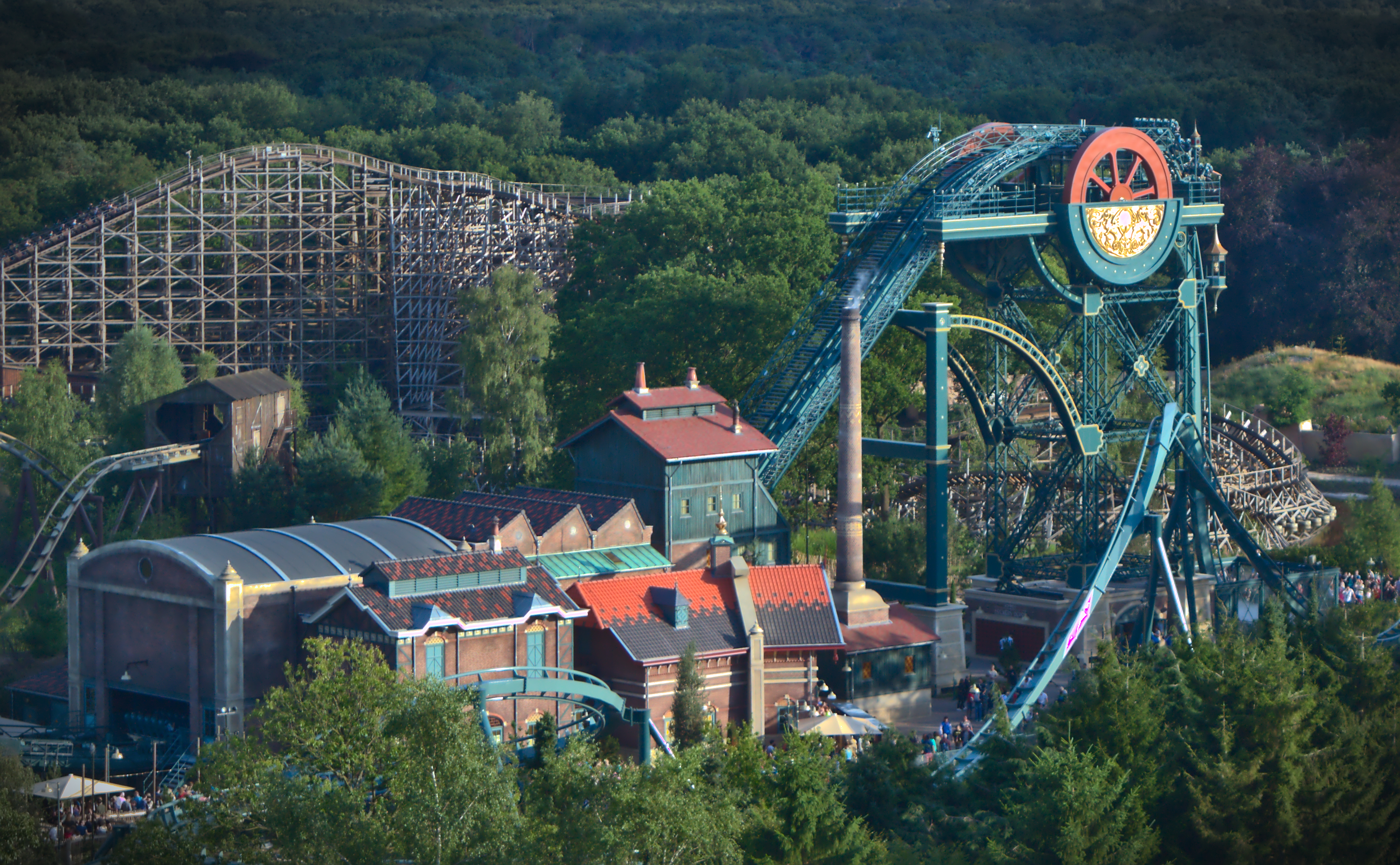
Efteling

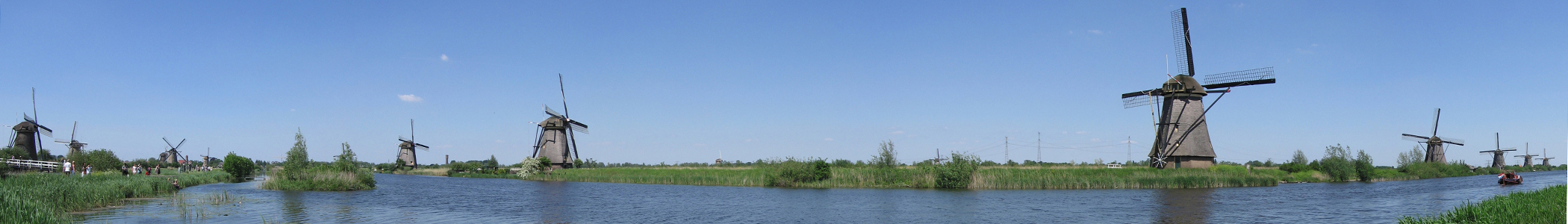
Kinderdijk

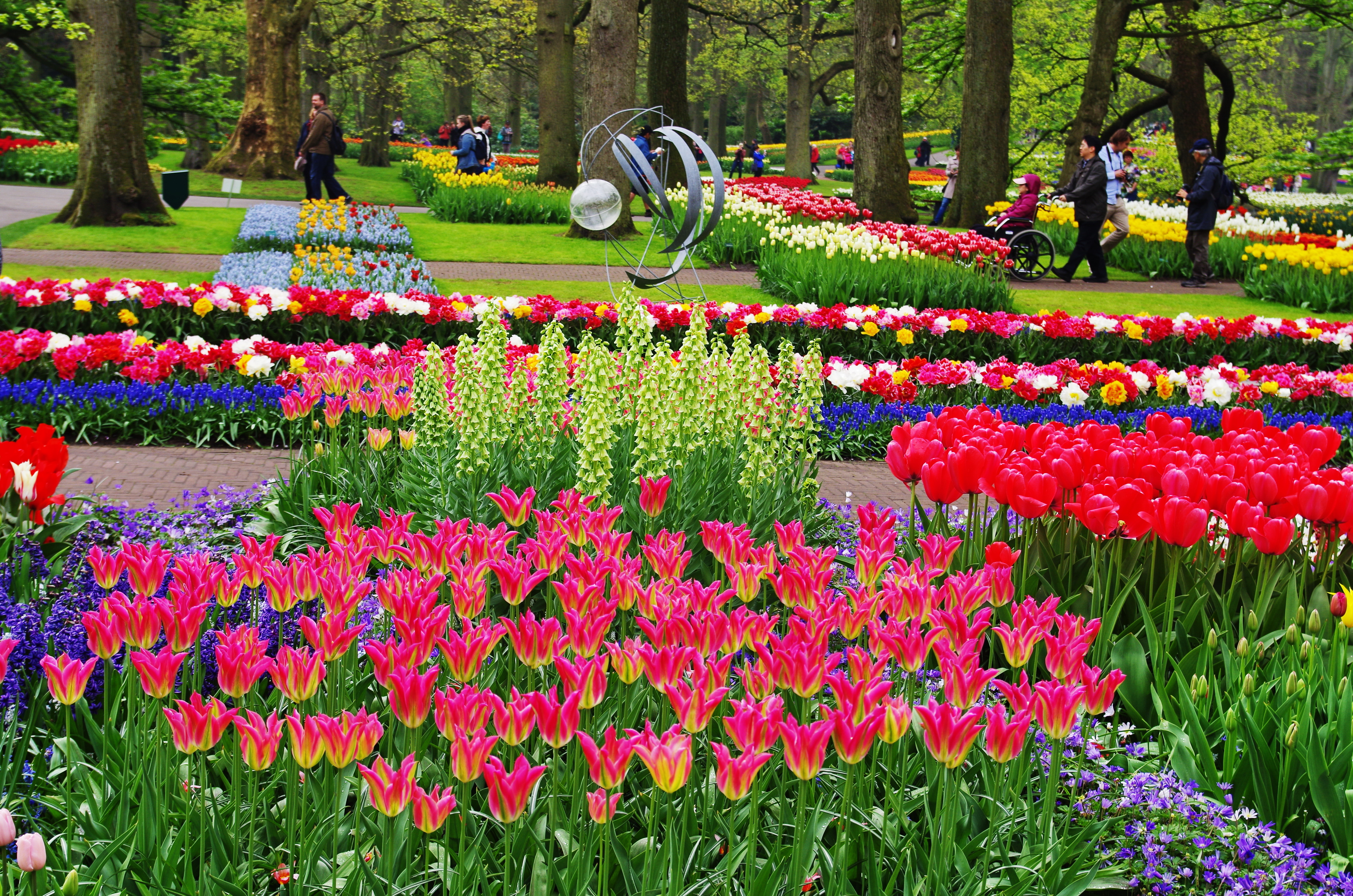
Keukenhof

Tourism in the Netherlands is a relatively small sector of the country's economy with a total contribution of 5.4% to gross domestic product and 9.6% to employment. In 2017 the Netherlands was visited by 17 million foreign tourists (with more than 5 million coming from Germany), making it the 20th most visited country in the world.

Yearly tourist arrivals in millions

== Arrivals by country ==
=== Within Europe ===
Most visitors staying in all forms of accommodation in the Netherlands on short-term basis are from the following countries of nationality with the majority of tourists coming from within Europe itself.

Rank	Country	2017	2016	2015	2014	2013
1	Germany	5,190,000	4,628,000	4,283,000	3,894,000	3,495,000
2	Belgium	2,240,000	2,124,000	1,965,000	1,828,000	1,673,000
3	France	2,240,000	2,084,000	1,750,000	1,725,000	1,680,000
4	United Kingdom	2,195,000	2,043,000	1,967,001	1,857,000	1,680,000
5	Italy	565,000	525,000	543,000	503,000	461,000
6	Spain	445,000	445,000	432,000	396,000	395,000
7	Switzerland	285,000	264,000	271,000	256,000	231,000
8	Russia	175,000	130,000	152,000	196,000	203,000
9	Sweden	160,000	156,000	154,000	142,000	142,000
10	Denmark	160,000	144,000	155,000	141,000	144,000
11	Norway	125,000	115,000	132,000	125,000	127,000
Total foreign		17,610,000	15,834,000	15,007,000	13,925,000	12,783,000

=== Other continents ===
In 2017, the United States (1,414,000 tourists, a 20% growth from the 1,182,000 Americans who visited in 2016), China (364,000 tourists, a 22% growth from the 297,000 of 2016), and Canada (180,000 tourists, a 16% growth from the 155,000 Canadians tourists of 2016) are the major non-European homelands of international tourists coming to the Netherlands. The total of foreign tourists visiting the Netherlands in 2017 was 17,924,000, a 13% growth from the 15,829,000 foreign people who visited the country in 2016.

== See also ==
- List of castles in the Netherlands
- List of museums in the Netherlands
