= HU University of Applied Sciences Utrecht =

University in Utrecht, Netherlands

- Hogeschool Utrecht, HU
- Type: Vocational university
- Established: 1995; 31 years ago
- President: Prof. dr. W. Scholte op Reimer
- Students: 35,000
- Location: Utrecht, Utrecht (province), Netherlands
- Website: www.hu.nl

The University of Applied Sciences Utrecht (HU) is a higher vocational university in Utrecht, Netherlands.

Several student communities are present in the university. On April 19, 2021, it was announced that the Celsius student team won three awards in the Solar Decathlon Build Challenge held by United States Department of Energy.

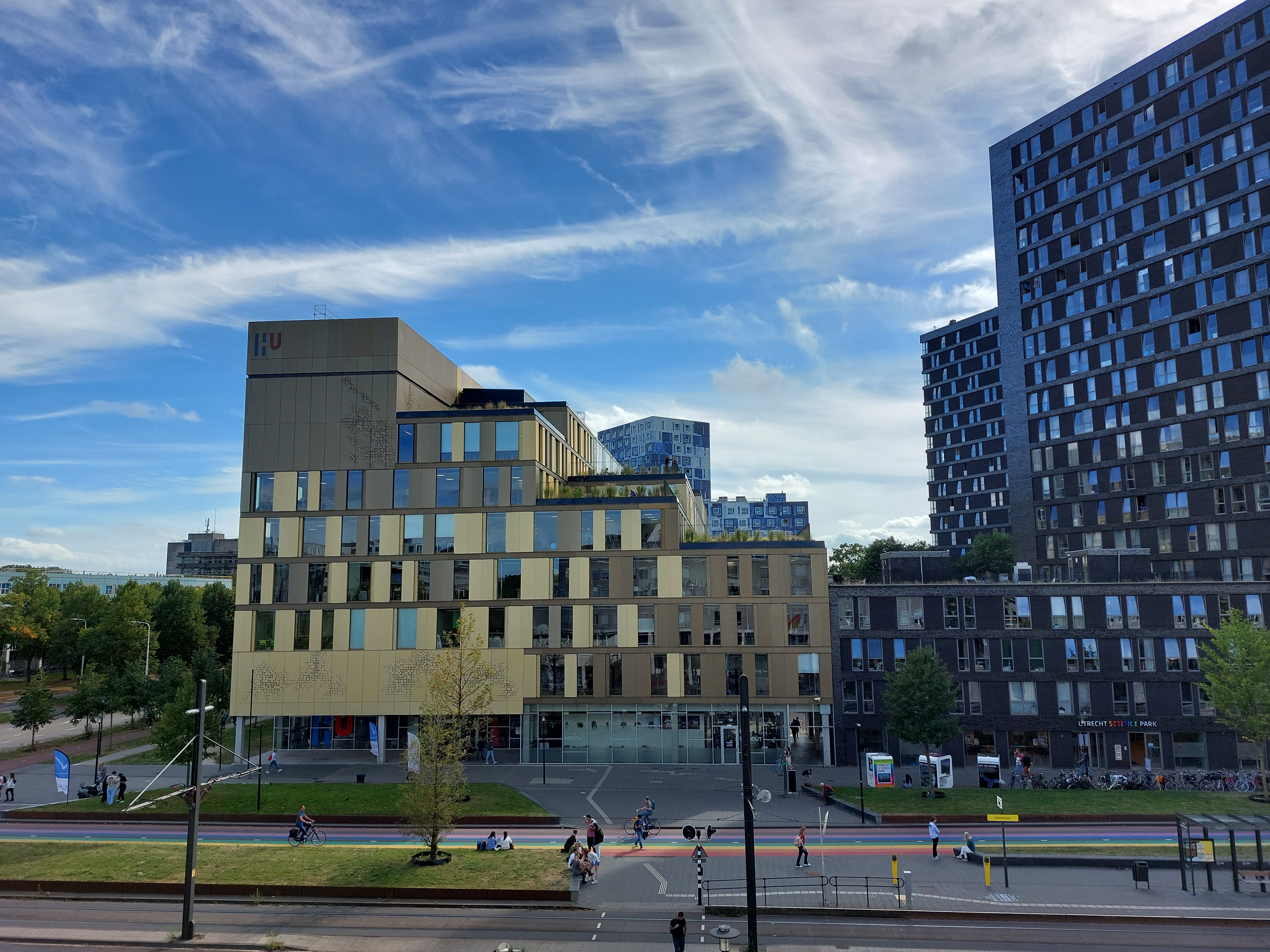

== History ==
The Hogeschool van Utrecht (HvU) was created in 1988 through a merger of several polytechnics schools in the city and province of Utrecht. On 1 September 2005, the HvU merged with the polytechnic school in Driebergen (De Horst). At the same time, the name was changed to Hogeschool Utrecht (HU) and the English (HU University of Applied Sciences Utrecht) name was adopted.

== Employees ==
At the end of 2020, 3,552 employees were employed. Of these, 2,409 were teaching/research staff and 1,143 were support staff. In that year, 91% of the teaching staff had a master's degree and 13% had a PhD. At the end of 2020, 49 professors were working on practice-oriented research. In that year, 347 lecturers and other researchers were involved in practice-oriented research, while 118 employees conducted PhD research.

== Students ==
There are 27,800 full-time Bachelor's students, 5,019 part-time and dual Bachelor's students, 2,801 Master's students and 565 association degree students (reference date: 31 December 2020). More than a fifth of the students at Hogeschool Utrecht are working professionals.
