= Wim Dik =

Dutch politician (1939–2022)

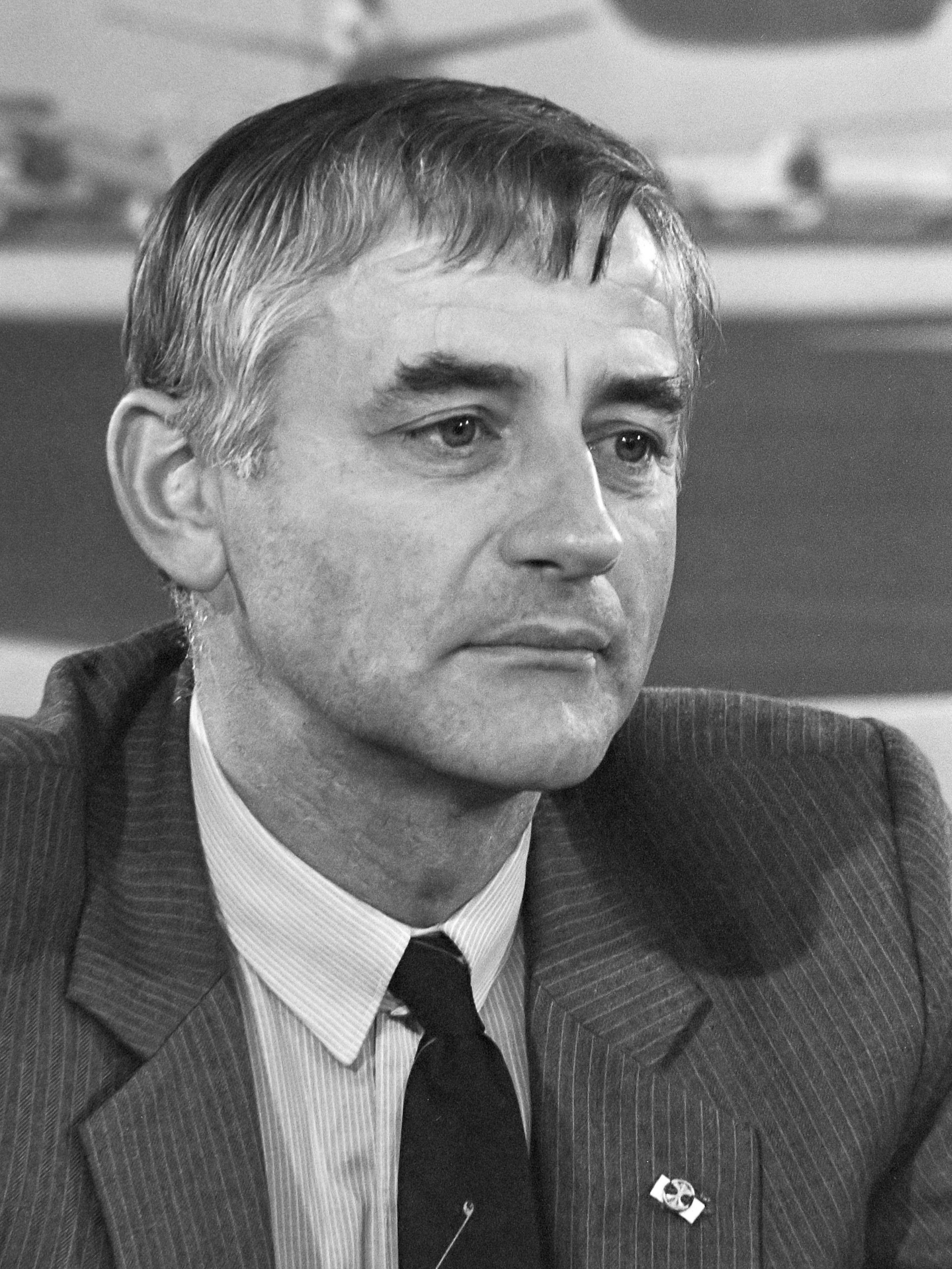
Dik in 1984

Willem "Wim" Dik (11 January 1939 – 19 June 2022) was a Dutch politician.

== Biography ==
He was born in Rotterdam. He was the head of KPN NV, Holland's formerly state-owned postal and telecom service. On behalf of Democrats 66 (D66) he was a State Secretary in the Third Van Agt cabinet from 1981 to 1982.

He died in Helvoirt.
