= List of ministers of climate policy of the Netherlands =

Minister of Climate Policy and Green Growth of the Netherlands
- Minister van Klimaat en Groene Groei
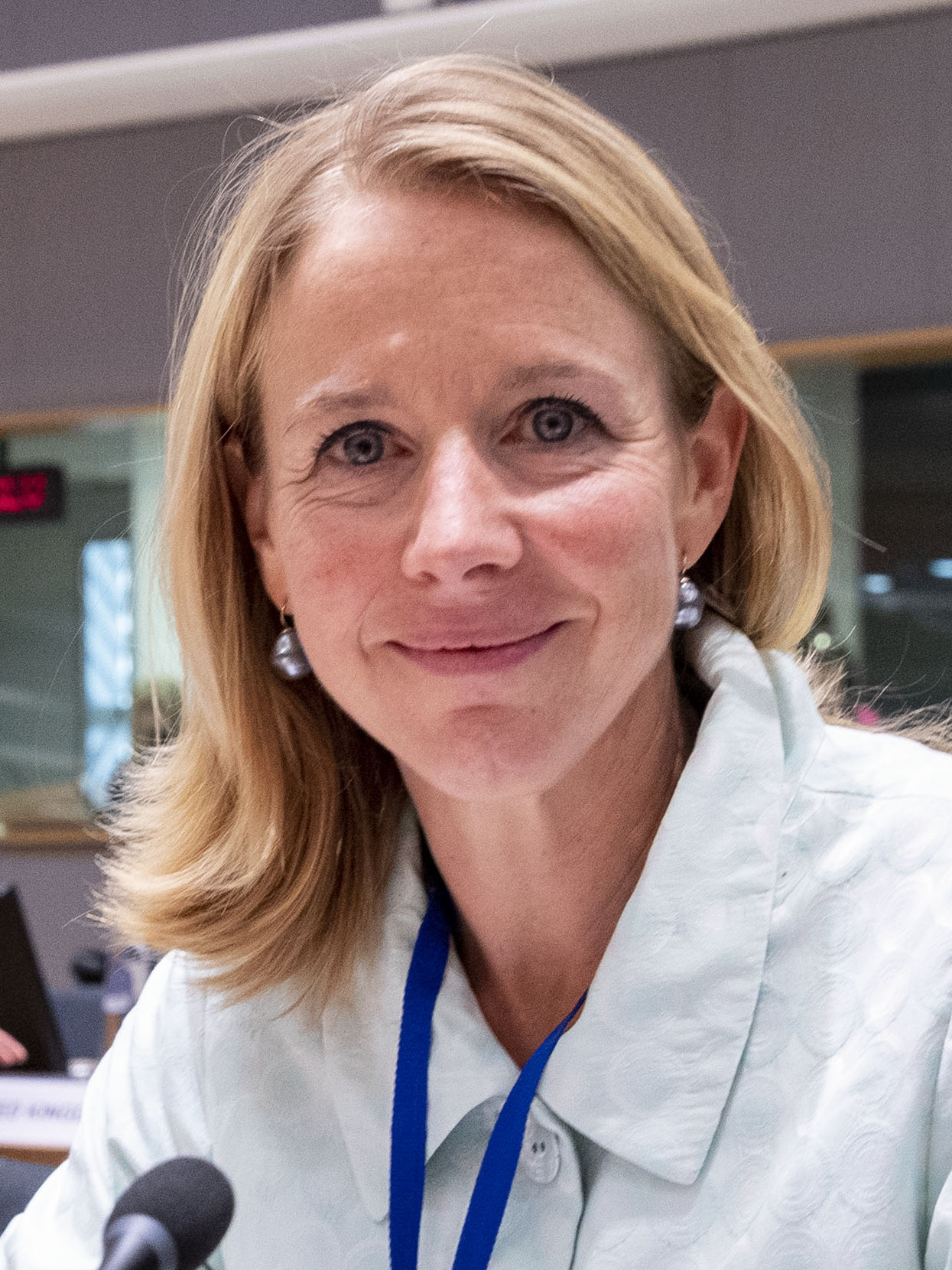
- Incumbent; Stientje van Veldhoven since 23 February 2026; 6 months ago
- Ministry of Economic Affairs and Climate Policy
- Style: His/Her Excellency
- Member of: Council of Ministers
- Appointer: The monarch on advice of the prime minister
- First holder: Eric Wiebes as Minister of Economic Affairs and Climate Policy; 26 October 2017; 8 years ago
- Salary: €205,991 (As of 2025)

The Netherlands has had a dedicated minister responsible for climate change mitigation and energy policy since 2017. The role had originally been an addition to the portfolio of the minister of Economic Affairs, but later became a separate position in the cabinet of the Netherlands. From 2024, the officeholder has held the official title minister of Climate Policy and Green Growth (Dutch: minister van Klimaat en Groene Groei). The current minister, Stientje van Veldhoven, has served since 23 February 2026.

== List of ministers of climate policy ==
| Cabinet | Minister | | | Term of office | | Title |
| Cabinet | Image | Name | Party | Start | End | Title |
|---|---|---|---|---|---|---|
| Rutte III | Eric Wiebes | Eric Wiebes | VVD | 26 October 2017 | 15 January 2021 | Minister of Economic Affairs and Climate Policy |
| Rutte III | Cora van Nieuwenhuizen | Cora van Nieuwenhuizen (ad interim) | VVD | 15 January 2021 | 20 January 2021 | Minister of Economic Affairs and Climate Policy |
| Rutte III | Bas van 't Wout | Bas van 't Wout | VVD | 20 January 2021 | 25 May 2021 | Minister of Economic Affairs and Climate Policy |
| Rutte III | Stef Blok | Stef Blok (Note: Responsibility for climate and energy policy was delegated to State Secretary Dilan Yeşilgöz-Zegerius.) | VVD | 25 May 2021 | 10 January 2022 | Minister of Economic Affairs and Climate Policy |
| Rutte IV | Rob Jetten | Rob Jetten | D66 | 10 January 2022 | 2 July 2024 | Minister for Climate and Energy Policy (Note: Minister without portfolio within the Ministry of Economic Affairs and Climate Policy.) |
| Schoof | Sophie Hermans | Sophie Hermans | VVD | 2 July 2024 | 23 February 2026 | Minister of Climate Policy and Green Growth |
| Jetten | | Stientje van Veldhoven | D66 | 23 February 2026 | Incumbent | Minister of Climate Policy and Green Growth |

== List of state secretaries for climate policy ==
| Cabinet | State secretary | | | Term of office | | Title | Ministry |
| Cabinet | Image | Name | Party | Start | End | Title | Ministry |
|---|---|---|---|---|---|---|---|
| Rutte III | Dilan Yeşilgöz-Zegerius | Dilan Yeşilgöz-Zegerius | VVD | 25 May 2021 | 10 January 2022 | State Secretary for Economic Affairs and Climate Policy | Economic Affairs and Climate Policy |
| Jetten | | Jo-Annes de Bat | CDA | 23 February 2026 | Incumbent | State Secretary for Climate Policy and Green Growth | Economic Affairs and Climate Policy |

== See also ==
- List of ministers of climate change
- Ministry of Climate Policy and Green Growth
