= List of ministers of climate change =

A list of ministers of climate change or officials in charge of cabinet positions with portfolios dealing primarily with climate change and issues related to mitigation of global warming.

== A ==
=== Australia ===
See Australian list of ministers for climate change

=== Austria ===
Title	Minister	Term start	Term end	Government	Notes
Minister of Climate Action, Environment, Energy, Mobility, Innovation and Technology	Leonore Gewessler (G)	2020-01-29	2021-10-11	Kurz 2 (V)	
Minister of Climate Action, Environment, Energy, Mobility, Innovation and Technology	Leonore Gewessler (G)	2021-10-11	2021-12-06	Schallenberg (V)	
Minister of Climate Action, Environment, Energy, Mobility, Innovation and Technology	Leonore Gewessler (G)	2021-12-06	2025-03-03	Nehammer (V)	
Minister of Climate Action, Environment, Energy, Mobility, Innovation and Technology	Peter Hanke (S)	2025-03-03	2025-04-01	Stocker (V)	
Minister for Agriculture and Forestry, Climate and Environmental Protection, Regions and Water Management	Norbert Totschnig (V)	2025-04		Stocker (V)	

== B ==
=== Belgium ===
Title	Minister	Term start	Term end	Government	Notes
Minister for Climate and Energy	Paul Magnette (S)	2007-12-21	2008-03-20	Verhofstadt 3 (L)	
Minister for Climate and Energy	Paul Magnette (S)	2008-03-20	2008-12-30	Leterme 1 (C)	
Minister for Climate and Energy	Paul Magnette (S)	2008-12-30	2009-11-24	Van Rompuy (C)	
Minister for Climate and Energy	Paul Magnette (S)	2009-11-24	2011-12-06	Leterme 2 (C)	

See also Belgian ministers of mobility (transport) who later included it in their portfolio

== C ==
=== Canada ===
Title	Minister	Term start	Term end	Cabinet	Notes
Minister of Environment and Climate Change	Catherine McKenna (L)	2015-11-04	2019-11-20	Trudeau, 29 (L)	
Minister of Environment and Climate Change	Jonathan Wilkinson	2019-11-20	2021-10-26	Trudeau, 29 (L)	
Minister of Environment and Climate Change	Steven Guilbeault	2021-10-26	2025-03-14	Trudeau, 29 (L)	
Minister of Environment and Climate Change	Terry Duguid	2025-03-14	2025-05-13	Carney, 30	
Minister of Environment and Climate Change	Julie Dabrusin	2025-05-13	2025-12-01	Carney, 30	
Minister of the Environment, Climate Change and Nature	Julie Dabrusin	2025-12-01		Carney, 30	

== D ==
=== Denmark ===
See Ministry of Climate, Energy and Utilities

== E ==
=== European Union ===
See List of commissioners

== F ==
=== Finland ===
See List of ministers of the environment and climate change

=== France ===
Title	Minister	Term start	Term end	Government	Notes
Minister for Ecological Transition, Energy, Climate, and Risk Prevention	Agnès Pannier-Runacher (RE)	2024-09-21		Barnier (LR)	
Minister for Ecological Transition, Biodiversity and International Negotiations on Climate and Nature	Monique Barbut (i)	2025-10-12		Lecornu 2 (RE)	

== G ==
=== Germany ===
Title	Minister	Party	Term start	Term end	Chancellor	Cabinet	Notes
Federal Minister for Economic Affairs and Climate Action	Robert Habeck	Alliance 90/The Greens	8 December 2021	Incumbent	Olaf Scholz	Scholz cabinet	

=== Greece ===
Title	Minister	Party	Term start	Term end	Prime Minister	Cabinet	Notes
Minister for the Environment, Energy and Climate Change	Tina Birbili	Panhellenic Socialist Movement	7 October 2009	17 June 2011	George Papandreou	Cabinet of George Papandreou	
Minister for the Environment, Energy and Climate Change	Giorgos Papakonstantinou	Panhellenic Socialist Movement	17 June 2011	11 November 2011	George Papandreou	Cabinet of George Papandreou	
Minister for the Environment, Energy and Climate Change	Giorgos Papakonstantinou	Panhellenic Socialist Movement	11 November 2011	17 May 2012	Lucas Papademos	Cabinet of Lucas Papademos	
Minister for the Environment, Energy and Climate Change	Grigoris Tsaltas	Independent	17 May 2012	21 June 2012	Panagiotis Pikrammenos	Cabinet of Panagiotis Pikrammenos	
Minister for the Environment, Energy and Climate Change	Evangelos Livieratos	Independent	21 June 2012	25 June 2013	Antonis Samaras	Cabinet of Antonis Samaras	
Minister for the Environment, Energy and Climate Change	Giannis Maniatis	Panhellenic Socialist Movement	25 June 2013	27 January 2015	Antonis Samaras	Cabinet of Antonis Samaras	
Ministry of the Climate Crisis and Civil Protection	Christos Stylianides	Independent (Note: Stylianides is a member of the Cypriot political party Democratic Rally.)	10 September 2021	Incumbent	Kyriakos Mitsotakis	Cabinet of Kyriakos Mitsotakis	

== I ==
=== Ireland ===
Title	Minister	Party	Term start	Term end	Taoiseach	Government	Notes
Minister for Communications, Climate Action and Environment	Denis Naughten	Independent	23 July 2016	14 June 2017	Enda Kenny	30th government	
Minister for Communications, Climate Action and Environment	Denis Naughten	Independent	14 June 2017	11 October 2018	Leo Varadkar	31st government	
Minister for Communications, Climate Action and Environment	Richard Bruton	Fine Gael	11 October 2018	27 June 2020	Leo Varadkar	31st government	
Minister for the Environment, Climate and Communications	Eamon Ryan	Green	27 June 2020	17 December 2022	Micheál Martin	32nd government	
Minister for the Environment, Climate and Communications	Eamon Ryan	Green	17 December 2022	9 April 2024	Leo Varadkar	33rd government	
Minister for the Environment, Climate and Communications	Eamon Ryan	Green	9 April 2024	23 January 2025	Simon Harris	34th government	
Minister for Climate, Energy and the Environment	Darragh O'Brien	Fianna Fáil	23 January 2025	Incumbent	Micheál Martin	35th government	

=== India ===
Title	Minister	Party	Term start	Term end	Prime Minister	Ministry	Notes
Minister of Environment, Forest and Climate Change	Prakash Javadekar	Bharatiya Janata Party	26 May 2014	5 July 2016	Narendra Modi	First Modi ministry	
Minister of Environment, Forest and Climate Change	Anil Madhav Dave	Bharatiya Janata Party	5 July 2016	18 May 2017	Narendra Modi	First Modi ministry	
Minister of Environment, Forest and Climate Change	Harsh Vardhan	Bharatiya Janata Party	18 May 2017	30 May 2019	Narendra Modi	First Modi ministry	
Minister of Environment, Forest and Climate Change	Prakash Javadekar	Bharatiya Janata Party	30 May 2019	7 July 2021	Narendra Modi	Second Modi ministry	
Minister of Environment, Forest and Climate Change	Bhupender Yadav	Bharatiya Janata Party	7 July 2021	Incumbent	Narendra Modi	Second Modi ministry	

=== Italy ===
Title	Minister	Party	Term start	Term end	Prime Minister of Italy	Government	Notes
Minister for Ecological Transition	Roberto Cingolani	Independent	13 February 2021	22 October 2022	Mario Draghi	Draghi Cabinet	

== L ==
=== Luxembourg ===
Title	Minister	Party	Term start	Term end	Prime Minister	Government	Notes
Minister for the Environment	Carole Dieschbourg	The Greens	4 December 2013	5 December 2018	Xavier Bettel	Bettel I Government	
Minister of the Environment, Climate, and Sustainable Development	Carole Dieschbourg	The Greens	5 December 2018	22 April 2022	Xavier Bettel	Bettel II Government	
Minister of the Environment, Climate, and Sustainable Development	Joëlle Welfring	The Greens	2 May 2022	17 November 2023	Xavier Bettel	Bettel II Government	
Minister of the Environment, Climate, and Biodiversity	Serge Wilmes	CSV	17 November 2023	Incumbent	Luc Frieden	Frieden-Bettel Government	

== M ==
=== Malaysia ===
Title	Minister	Party	Term start	Term end	Prime Minister	Cabinet	Notes
Minister of Energy, Science, Technology, Environment and Climate Change	Yeo Bee Yin	Democratic Action Party	2 July 2018	24 February 2020	Mahathir Mohamad	Seventh Mahathir cabinet	
Minister of Natural Resources, Environment and Climate Change	Nik Nazmi Nik Ahmad	People's Justice Party	3 December 2022	Incumbent	Anwar Ibrahim	Anwar cabinet	

=== Malta ===
Title	Minister	Party	Term start	Term end	Prime Minister	Cabinet	Notes
Minister for Environment, Sustainable Development, and Climate Change	Jose Herrera	Labour Party	9 June 2017	13 January 2020	Joseph Muscat	Muscat Cabinet	
Minister for the Environment, Climate Change and Planning	Aaron Farrugia	Labour Party	15 January 2020	20 February 2022	Robert Abela	Abela Cabinet	

== N ==
=== Netherlands ===
Title	Minister	Party	Term start	Term end	Cabinet	Notes
Minister of Economic Affairs and Climate Policy	Eric Wiebes	People's Party for Freedom and Democracy	26 October 2017	15 January 2021	Third Rutte cabinet	
Minister of Economic Affairs and Climate Policy	Cora van Nieuwenhuizen	People's Party for Freedom and Democracy	15 January 2021	20 January 2021	Third Rutte cabinet	
Minister of Economic Affairs and Climate Policy	Bas van 't Wout	People's Party for Freedom and Democracy	20 January 2021	10 January 2022	Third Rutte cabinet	
Minister for Climate and Energy Policy	Rob Jetten	Democrats 66	10 January 2022	2 July 2024	Fourth Rutte cabinet	
Minister of Climate Policy and Green Growth	Sophie Hermans	People's Party for Freedom and Democracy	2 July 2024	23 February 2025	Schoof cabinet	
Minister of Climate Policy and Green Growth	Stientje van Veldhoven	Democrats 66	23 February 2025	Incumbent	Jetten cabinet	

=== New Zealand ===
Title	Minister	Party	Term start	Term end	Prime Minister	Cabinet	Notes
Minister responsible for Climate Change Issues	David Parker	New Zealand Labour Party	19 October 2005	21 March 2006	Helen Clark	Fifth Labour Government of New Zealand	
Minister responsible for Climate Change Issues	Pete Hodgson	New Zealand Labour Party	21 March 2006	3 May 2006	Helen Clark	Fifth Labour Government of New Zealand	
Minister responsible for Climate Change Issues	David Parker	New Zealand Labour Party	3 May 2006	19 November 2008	Helen Clark	Fifth Labour Government of New Zealand	
Minister for Climate Change Issues	Nick Smith	New Zealand National Party	19 November 2008	21 March 2012	John Key	Fifth National Government of New Zealand	
Minister responsible for International Climate Change Negotiations	Tim Groser	New Zealand National Party	27 January 2010	21 March 2012	John Key	Fifth National Government of New Zealand	
Minister for Climate Change Issues	Tim Groser	New Zealand National Party	21 March 2012	14 December 2015	John Key	Fifth National Government of New Zealand	
Minister for Climate Change Issues	Paula Bennett	New Zealand National Party	14 December 2015	12 December 2016	John Key	Fifth National Government of New Zealand	
Minister for Climate Change Issues	Paula Bennett	New Zealand National Party	12 December 2016	26 October 2017	Bill English	Fifth National Government of New Zealand	
Minister for Climate Change	James Shaw	Green Party of Aotearoa New Zealand	26 October 2017	27 November 2023	Jacinda Ardern	Sixth Labour Government of New Zealand	
Minister for Climate Change	Simon Watts	New Zealand National Party	27 November 2023	Incumbent	Christopher Luxon	Sixth National Government of New Zealand	

=== Niue ===
Title	Minister	Party	Term start	Term end	Premier	Notes
Minister in Charge of Climate Change	Terry Coe	Independent	c. 12 November 1998		Frank Lui	
Minister of Meteorological Services and Climate Change	Igilisi Pihigia	Independent	1 May 2005	20 June 2008	Young Vivian	
Minister of Meteorological Services and Climate Change	Toke Talagi	Independent	20 June 2008	17 May 2011	Toke Talagi	

=== Norway ===
Title	Minister	Party	Term start	Term end	Prime Minister	Council	Notes
Minister of Climate and the Environment	Tine Sundtoft	Conservative Party	16 October 2013	16 December 2015	Erna Solberg	Solberg's Cabinet	
Minister of Climate and the Environment	Vidar Helgesen	Conservative Party	16 December 2015	17 January 2018	Erna Solberg	Solberg's Cabinet	
Minister of Climate and the Environment	Ola Elvestuen	Liberal Party	17 January 2018	24 January 2020	Erna Solberg	Solberg's Cabinet	
Minister of Climate and the Environment	Sveinung Rotevatn	Liberal Party	24 January 2020	14 October 2021	Erna Solberg	Solberg's Cabinet	
Minister of Climate and the Environment	Espen Barth Eide	Labour Party	14 October 2021	Incumbent	Jonas Gahr Støre	Støre's Cabinet	

== P ==
=== Pakistan ===
Title	Minister	Party	Term start	Term end	Prime Minister	Cabinet	Notes
Advisor to the Prime Minister for Climate Change	Malik Amin Aslam	Pakistan Tehreek-e-Insaf	20 August 2018	10 April 2022	Imran Khan	Imran Khan ministry	
Minister of State for Climate Change	Zartaj Gul	Pakistan Tehreek-e-Insaf	5 October 2018	10 April 2022	Imran Khan	Imran Khan ministry	
Minister of Climate Change	Sherry Rehman	Pakistan Peoples Party	19 April 2022	10 August 2023	Shehbaz Sharif	Shehbaz Sharif ministry	

=== Portugal ===
Title	Minister	Party	Term start	Term end	Prime Minister	Government	Notes
Minister of Environment and Climate Action	João Pedro Matos Fernandes	Independent	26 October 2019	30 March 2022	Antonio Costa	XXII Constitutional Government of Portugal	
Minister of Environment and Climate Action	Duarte Cordeiro	Socialist Party	30 March 2022	2 April 2024	Antonio Costa	XXIII Constitutional Government of Portugal	

== R ==
=== Romania ===
Title	Minister	Party	Term start	Term end	Prime Minister	Cabinet	Notes
Minister of Environment and Climate Change	Rovana Plumb	Social Democratic Party	21 December 2012	5 March 2014	Victor Ponta	Second Ponta Cabinet	
Minister of Environment and Climate Change	Atilla Korodi	Democratic Alliance of Hungarians in Romania	5 March 2014	13 December 2014	Victor Ponta	Third Ponta Cabinet	
Minister of Environment and Climate Change	Grațiela Gavrilescu	Alliance of Liberals and Democrats	13 December 2014	17 November 2015	Victor Ponta	Fourth Ponta Cabinet	
Minister of Environment and Climate Change	Cristiana Pașca-Palmer	Independent	17 November 2015	4 January 2017	Dacian Cioloș	Cioloș Cabinet	
Deputy Prime Minister and Minister of Environment and Climate Change	Daniel Constantin	Alliance of Liberals and Democrats	4 January 2017	3 April 2017	Sorin Grindeanu	Grindeanu Cabinet	
Deputy Prime Minister and Minister of Environment and Climate Change	Grațiela-Leocadia Gavrilescu	Alliance of Liberals and Democrats	3 April 2017	14 June 2017	Sorin Grindeanu	Grindeanu Cabinet	
Deputy Prime Minister and Minister of Environment and Climate Change	Grațiela-Leocadia Gavrilescu	Alliance of Liberals and Democrats	29 June 2017	29 January 2018	Mihai Tudose	Tudose Cabinet	

== S ==
=== Scotland ===
Title	Minister	Party	Term start	Term end	First Minister	Government	Notes
Minister for Transport, Infrastructure and Climate Change	Stewart Stevenson	Scottish National Party	17 May 2007	11 December 2010	Alex Salmond	First Salmond government	
Minister for Environment and Climate Change	Roseanna Cunningham	Scottish National Party	11 December 2010	24 May 2011	Alex Salmond	First Salmond government	
Minister for Environment and Climate Change	Stewart Stevenson	Scottish National Party	25 May 2011	6 September 2012	Alex Salmond	Second Salmond government	
Minister for Environment and Climate Change	Paul Wheelhouse	Scottish National Party	6 September 2012	21 November 2014	Alex Salmond	Second Salmond government	
Minister for Environment, Climate Change and Land Reform	Aileen McLeod	Scottish National Party	21 November 2014	18 May 2016	Nicola Sturgeon	First Sturgeon government	
Cabinet Secretary for Environment, Climate Change and Land Reform	Roseanna Cunningham	Scottish National Party	18 May 2016	20 May 2021	Nicola Sturgeon	Second Sturgeon government	

=== Spain ===
Title	Minister	Party	Term start	Term end	Prime Minister	Government	Notes
Minister for Ecological Transition	Teresa Ribera	Spanish Socialist Workers' Party	7 June 2018	13 January 2020	Pedro Sánchez	Sánchez I Government	
Minister for Ecological Transition and Demographic Challenge	Teresa Ribera	Spanish Socialist Workers' Party	13 January 2020	25 November 2024	Pedro Sánchez	Sánchez II Government	
Minister for the Ecological Transition and the Demographic Challenge	Sara Aagesen	Spanish Socialist Workers' Party	25 November 2024	Incumbent	Pedro Sánchez	Sánchez II Government	

=== Sweden ===
Title	Minister	Party	Term start	Term end	Prime Minister	Cabinet	Notes
Minister for the Climate	Åsa Romson	Green Party	3 October 2014	25 May 2016	Stefan Löfven	Löfven I Cabinet	
Minister for the Climate	Isabella Lövin	Green Party	25 May 2016	21 January 2019	Stefan Löfven	Löfven I Cabinet	
Minister for the Climate	Isabella Lövin	Green Party	21 January 2019	5 February 2021	Stefan Löfven	Löfven II Cabinet	
Minister for the Climate	Per Bolund	Green Party	5 February 2021	9 July 2021	Stefan Löfven	Löfven II Cabinet	
Minister for the Climate	Per Bolund	Green Party	9 July 2021	30 November 2021	Stefan Löfven	Löfven III Cabinet	
Minister for the Climate	Annika Strandhäll	Social Democrats	30 November 2021	17 October 2022	Magdalena Andersson	Andersson Cabinet	

== U ==
=== United Kingdom ===
Title	Minister	Party	Term start	Term end	Prime Minister	Ministry	Notes
Secretary of State for Energy and Climate Change	Ed Miliband	Labour Party	3 October 2008	11 May 2010	Gordon Brown	Brown ministry	
Secretary of State for Energy and Climate Change	Chris Huhne	Liberal Democrats	11 May 2010	3 February 2012	David Cameron	Cameron–Clegg coalition	
Secretary of State for Energy and Climate Change	Ed Davey	Liberal Democrats	3 February 2012	8 May 2015	David Cameron	Cameron–Clegg coalition	
Secretary of State for Energy and Climate Change	Amber Rudd	Conservative Party	11 May 2015	14 July 2016	David Cameron	Second Cameron ministry	
Parliamentary Under-Secretary of State for Climate Change	Ian Duncan, Baron Duncan of Springbank	Conservative Party	26 July 2019	13 December 2019	Boris Johnson	First Johnson ministry	
Parliamentary Under-Secretary of State for Climate Change	Ian Duncan, Baron Duncan of Springbank	Conservative Party	13 December 2019	13 February 2020	Boris Johnson	Second Johnson ministry	
Parliamentary Under-Secretary of State for Climate Change and Corporate Responsibility	Martin Callanan, Baron Callanan	Conservative Party	13 December 2019	Incumbent	Boris Johnson	Second Johnson ministry	

=== United Arab Emirates ===
Title	Minister	Party	Term start	Term end	Prime Minister	Ministry	Notes
Minister of Climate Change and Environment	Thani bin Ahmed Al Zeyoudi	Independent	February 2016	July 2020	Mohammed bin Rashid Al Maktoum	Ministry of Climate Change and Environment	
Minister of Climate Change and Environment	Abdullah Belhaif Al Nuaimi	Independent	July 2020	September 2021	Mohammed bin Rashid Al Maktoum	Ministry of Climate Change and Environment	
Minister of Climate Change and Environment	Mariam Al Muhairi	Independent	September 2021	January 2024	Mohammed bin Rashid Al Maktoum	Ministry of Climate Change and Environment	
Minister of Climate Change and Environment	Amna bint Abdullah Al Dahak	Independent	January 2024	Incumbent	Mohammed bin Rashid Al Maktoum	Ministry of Climate Change and Environment	

== W ==
=== Wales ===
Title	Minister	Party	Term start	Term end	First Minister	Government	Notes
Minister for Climate Change	Julie James	Welsh Labour Party	13 May 2021	Incumbent	Mark Drakeford	Second Drakeford government	

== See also ==
- List of environmental ministries
