= 2025–2026 Dutch cabinet formation =

Formation of the Jetten cabinet

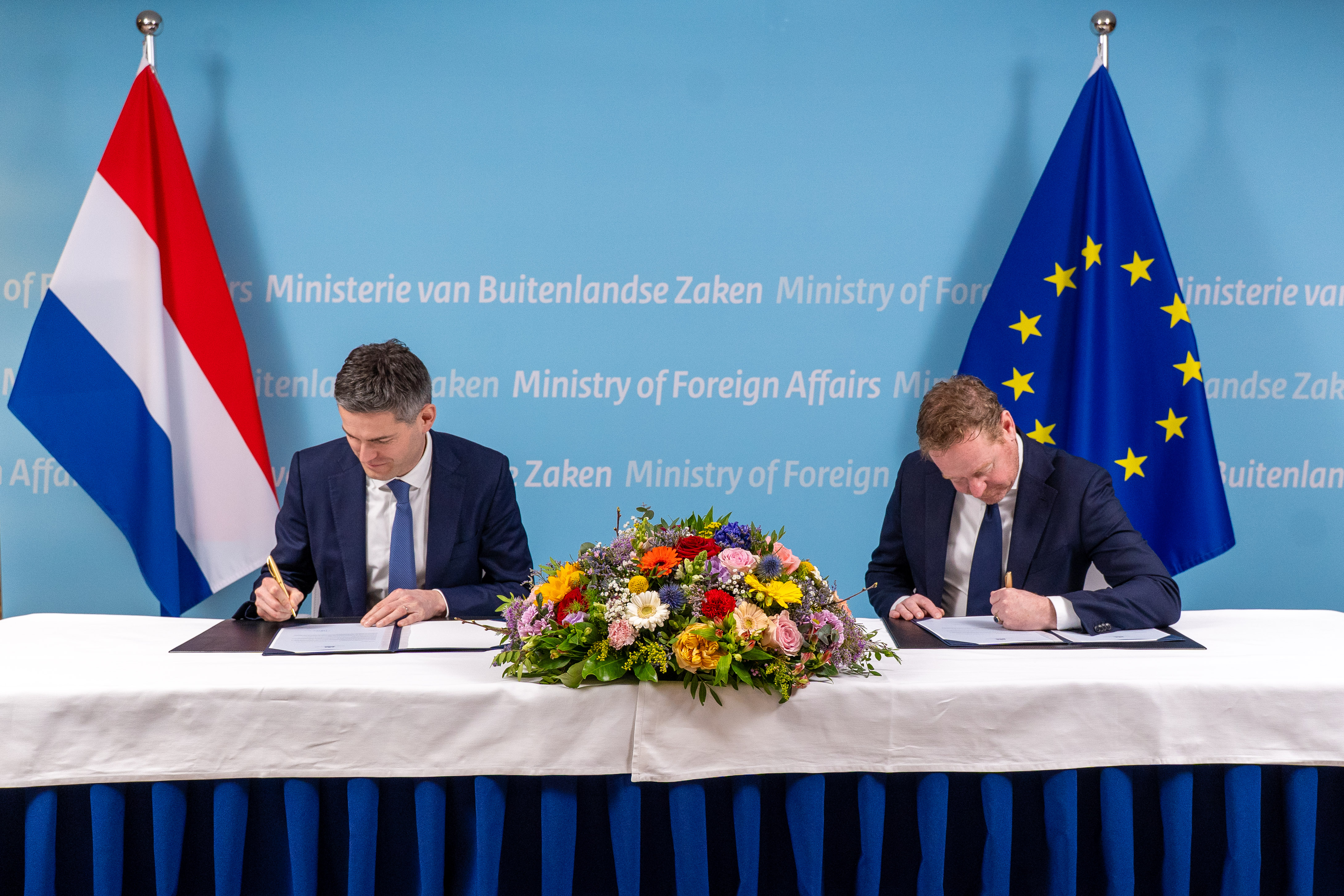
Incoming minister of Foreign Affairs Tom Berendsen (l) and outgoing minister David van Weel sign the transfer documents on 23 February 2026

Following the Dutch general election on 29 October 2025, a process of cabinet formation was started. After 117 days, the Jetten cabinet was formed, a minority cabinet consisting of Democrats 66 (D66), People's Party for Freedom and Democracy (VVD) and Christian Democratic Appeal (CDA).

On 4 November 2025, Wouter Koolmees was selected as scout, after being nominated by the largest party, D66. There was no obvious majority coalition, as the VVD ruled out a coalition with GroenLinks-PvdA (GL-PvdA), and D66 did not want to form a government which included both JA21 and the VVD.

On Koolmees' advice, D66 and CDA started substantial negotiations on 13 November 2025. They were guided by informateur Sybrand Buma (CDA), with Hans Wijers (D66) having resigned on the second day after doubts emerged regarding his neutrality. The document drawn up by D66 and CDA was unable to break the deadlock.

Buma subsequently advised continuing negotiations with the VVD included. The talks took place under the guidance of informateur Rianne Letschert (D66) from 10 December 2025. D66, VVD and CDA agreed to form a minority cabinet and presented their coalition agreement on 30 January 2026. Selection of ministers and state secretaries began on 3 February 2026 with D66 leader Rob Jetten as formateur. The 28 members of the Jetten cabinet were sworn in on 23 February 2026.

== Background ==
Composition of the newly installed House of Representatives throughout the cabinet formation: GL-PvdA: 20 SP: 3 50+: 2 PvdD: 3 Volt: 1 D66: 26 DENK: 3 CU: 3 SGP: 3 CDA: 18 VVD: 22 BBB: 4 JA21: 9 FvD: 7 Markuszower Group (ex-PVV) (7) PVV: 26

=== Schoof cabinet and campaign ===
The previous Schoof cabinet, established after the lengthy 2023–2024 cabinet formation, included the Party for Freedom (PVV), People's Party for Freedom and Democracy (VVD), New Social Contract (NSC), and Farmer–Citizen Movement (BBB). The cabinet fell on 3 June 2025, after the PVV left the coalition due to disagreements on asylum policy.

During the campaign, possible coalitions were discussed. GL-PvdA, D66, CDA, and smaller parties continued to exclude the PVV. The VVD ruled out governing with the PVV, and also repeatedly made clear it did not want to join a coalition with the GL-PvdA.

=== Election results ===
D66 and PVV won 26 seats each, with D66 winning more votes. 26 seats was the lowest number of seats ever won by the largest party. Based on the results, a centrist cabinet of D66, VVD, CDA, and GroenLinks-PvdA would have a majority of 86 seats in the House. The VVD's preferred "centre-right" cabinet of D66, VVD, CDA, and JA21 would have 75 seats, and would require a fifth party to reach a majority.

== Scout Koolmees ==
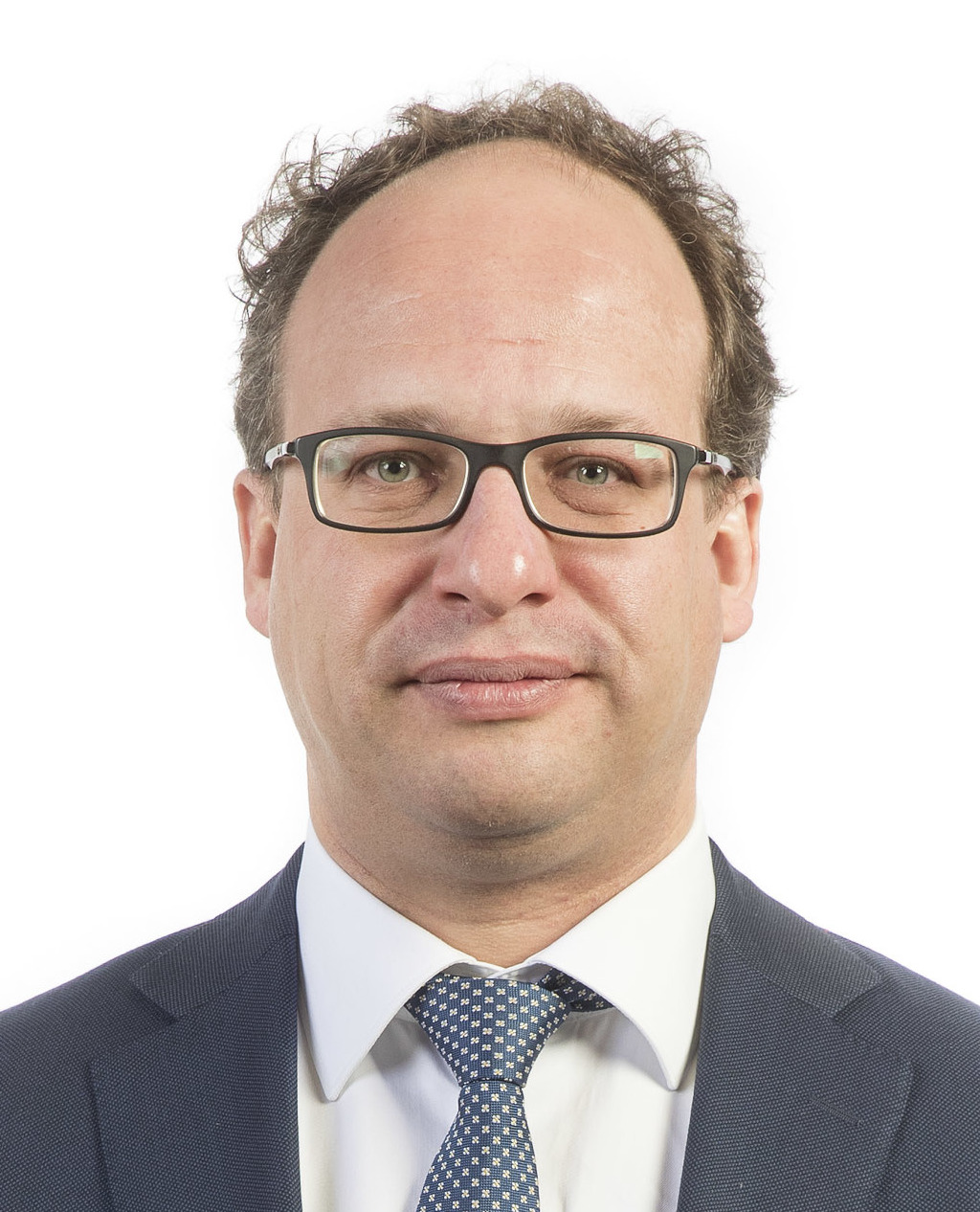
Scout Wouter Koolmees (D66), 2017

Because of uncertainty over which party would end up as the largest, the selection of a scout was postponed until 4 November. President of the Nederlandse Spoorwegen and former minister Wouter Koolmees was selected as scout, as proposed by his party, D66. Koolmees met the party leaders on 5 and 6 November.

D66 party leader Rob Jetten expressed a preference for a centrist coalition. He was open to negotiating with JA21 if not together with VVD. GroenLinks–PvdA parliamentary leader Jesse Klaver, who was chosen after lead candidate Frans Timmermans retired following the electoral loss, was open to either governing or remaining in opposition. PVV leader Geert Wilders wanted to join a coalition, and ruled out providing confidence and supply. VVD leader Dilan Yeşilgöz reiterated that the VVD did not want to form a coalition with GroenLinks–PvdA, instead favouring a centre-right coalition with JA21. CDA leader Henri Bontenbal refused to express a preference. JA21 leader Joost Eerdmans preferred a right-wing coalition with a majority, and said there was no chance of a coalition with GroenLinks–PvdA.

BBB leader Caroline van der Plas said she did not want to join a cabinet but was "not opposed" to a coalition of D66, VVD, CDA, and JA21. SP leader Jimmy Dijk and CU leader Mirjam Bikker saw no role for their parties in a cabinet, and predicted the centrist cabinet as the most logical option. SGP leader Chris Stoffer favoured the formation of a right-wing coalition, possibly with PVV, and ruled out joining or supporting a cabinet with D66.

On 7 November, Koolmees met with Jetten and Eerdmans, and separately with Yeşilgöz and Klaver. Neither meeting changed the positions of VVD or D66 regarding GroenLinks–PvdA and JA21 respectively. At the end of his assignment on 11 November, Koolmees advised that D66 and CDA should negotiate for three weeks. Their negotiations should focus on housing, nitrogen, the economy, international security, and migration.

== Informateurs Buma and Wijers ==
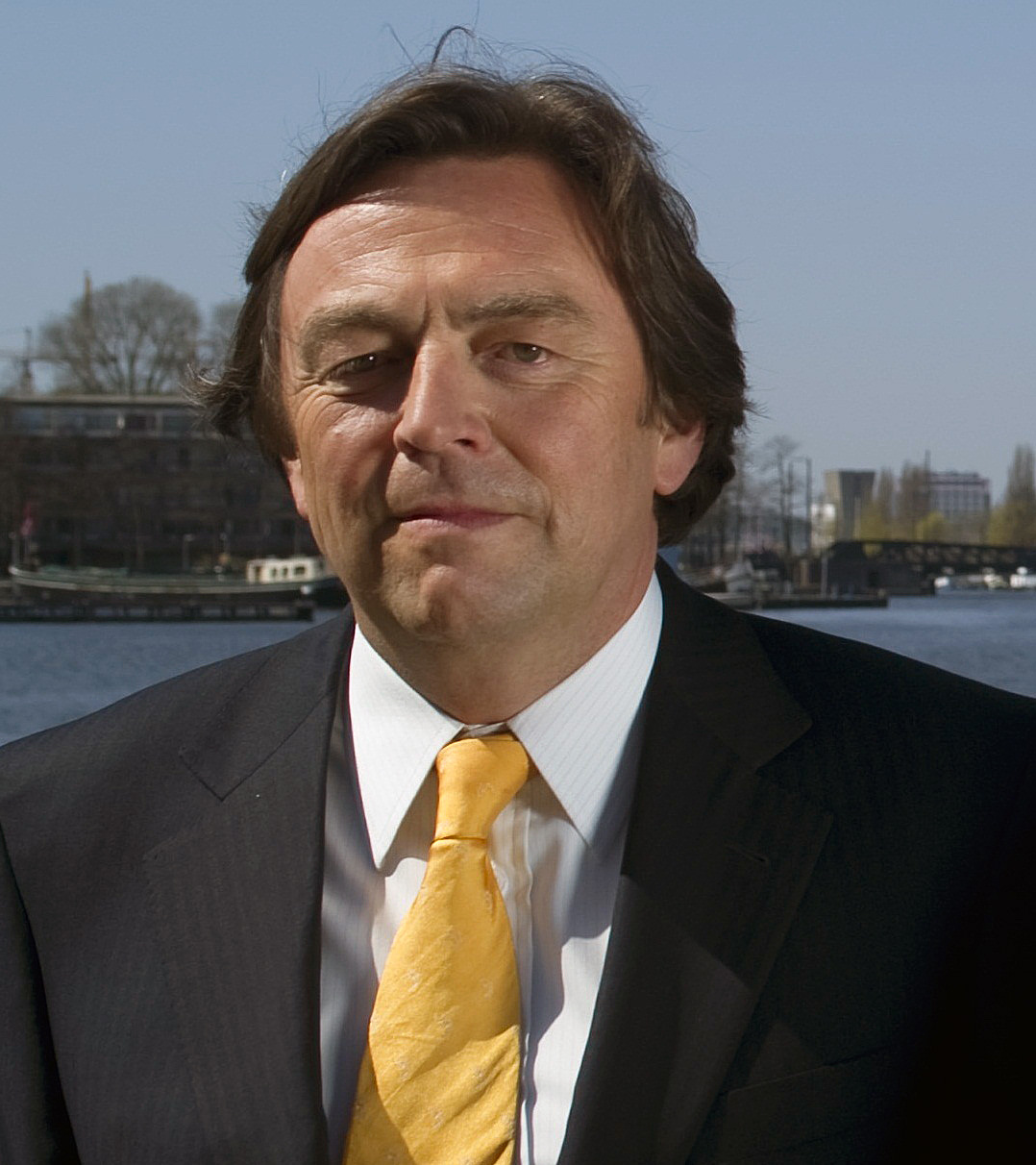
Informateur Hans Wijers (D66), 2010

On 13 November, mayor of Leeuwarden and former CDA leader Sybrand Buma and former D66 minister Hans Wijers were appointed as informateurs, with the assignment proposed by Koolmees. On the same day, NRC and De Telegraaf reported that Wijers had expressed a preference for a centrist cabinet on election night, and had called Yeşilgöz a liar. At a press conference on 13 November, he retracted his comments and apologised. On 14 November, NRC confronted Wijers with an older private message in which he called Yeşilgöz "a witch", at which point he resigned. Two weeks later, NRC corrected their first story, after journalist Eric Smit came forward to say that he, not Wijers, had called Yeşilgöz a liar.

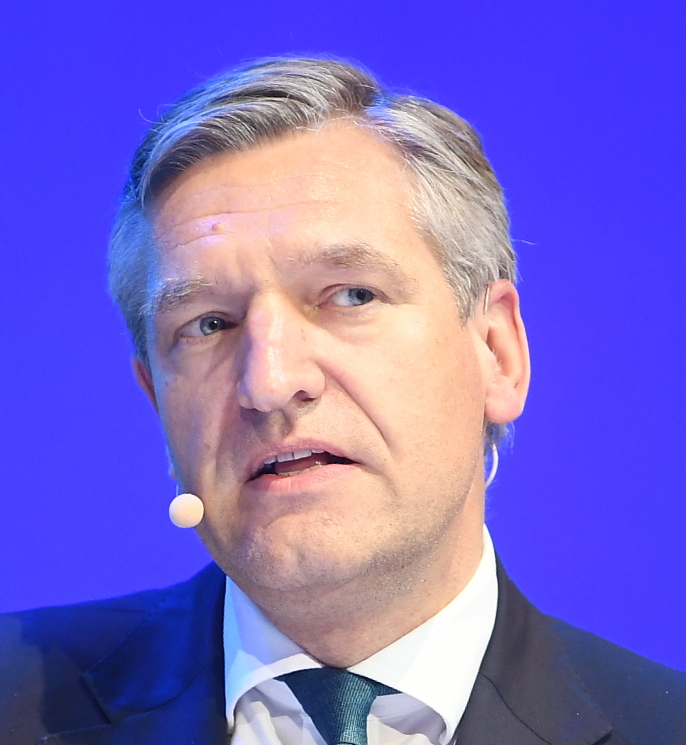
Informateur Sybrand Buma (CDA), 2018

Jetten, Bontenbal, and Buma invited experts and interest groups to update them on the five themes, accompanied by co-negotiators Jan Paternotte (D66) and Bart van den Brink (CDA). They composed a joint document parallel to the meetings, intended as an outreach to other parties, which was presented along with Buma's interim report on 2 December. The document included, among other things, a strict asylum policy, the retention of the Dispersal Act, and a phase-out of the mortgage interest deduction.

Buma presented the document to the other party leaders over the next two days. Although most parties saw points of agreement, the deadlocks persisted. On 5 December, Buma met with the leaders of D66, VVD, GL-PvdA, CDA, and JA21. His proposal for a five-party coalition was not received enthusiastically and was blocked by the VVD. GL-PvdA also ruled out providing confidence and supply to a minority government.

Over the weekend, it was decided that D66, VVD, and CDA would continue negotiations on a "basic governing agreement", while still keeping the option of a majority coalition open. On 8 December, Buma presented his recommendation for the three parties to proceed with negotiations.

== Informateur Letschert ==
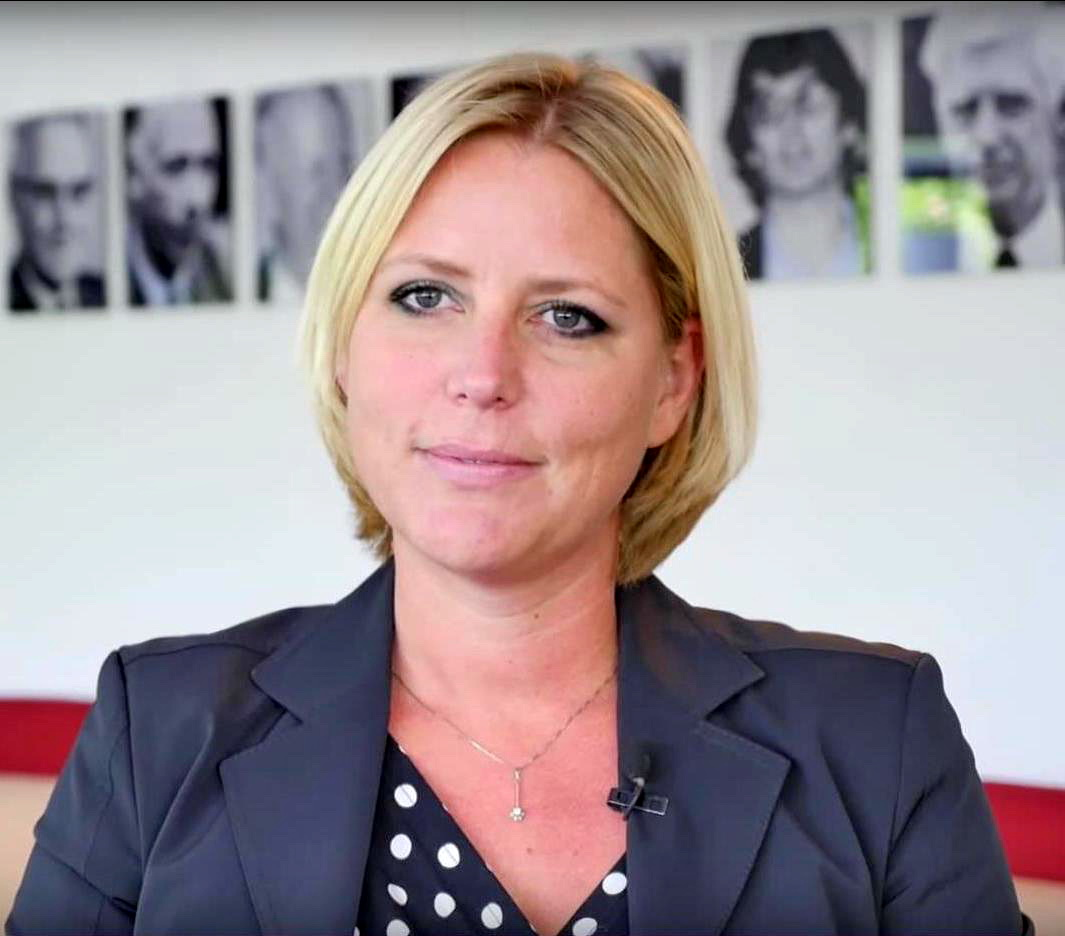
Informateur Rianne Letschert (D66), 2015

On 10 December, president of Maastricht University Rianne Letschert was appointed as informateur, with the assignment proposed by Buma and a deadline of 30 January. On 14 and 15 December, negotiations took place between the party leaders of D66, CDA, and VVD at De Zwaluwenberg. The negotiators took a break from 24 December to 5 January due to the holidays.

=== Minority cabinet ===
On 8 and 9 January, they met again at De Zwaluwenberg. On the morning of 9 January, Letschert demanded that the party leaders choose the form of the coalition, otherwise she would resign as informateur. D66 and CDA had become increasingly open to a minority cabinet and persuaded the VVD after Letschert's intervention. After Yeşilgöz consulted her parliamentary group digitally for approval, the decision was made public in the afternoon.

Letschert and the negotiators then met with the other parliamentary leaders separately. Eerdmans expressed disappointment that his party was not allowed to participate, but said he was positive towards the idea of a minority cabinet. 50Plus also indicated it would adopt a cooperative stance. The SGP and ChristianUnion were also willing to offer support, but warned about their red lines regarding medical ethics and freedom of education.

Klaver stated that he intended to be a responsible opposition. After the conversation, he said that, in his view, the negotiators still had no idea how they intended to secure a majority. A week later, during his New Year's speech, Klaver announced that the party was open to deals with the minority cabinet, particularly on issues such as the nitrogen crisis, housing construction, and nature restoration. He stipulated as a condition that the cabinet must not dismantle the welfare state.

The only parliamentary leader who did not attend was Wilders. Within the parliamentary party, some MPs wanted the group to cooperate constructively with the minority government. When this and other grievances were not addressed, seven members of parliament, led by Gidi Markuszower, decided to split and form the Markuszower Group. The new group then informed Letschert that they were willing to meet the negotiators for talks.

=== Coalition agreement ===
In the week before the deadline, the parties discussed finances, on which they had long failed to reach an agreement. On 26 January, Letschert again threatened to resign if they did not reach a breakthrough within an hour. Letschert's intervention was successful, and the evening of 27 January, the negotiators reached an agreement. The next day, the parliamentary groups of D66, VVD and CDA approved the agreement.

On 30 January, the party leaders presented the agreement with the title Aan de slag ("Get started"). The agreement included increases in spending on defence (to meet the 5% NATO pledge) and education, paid for by higher taxes and cuts to health care and unemployment benefits.

== Formateur Jetten ==
On 3 February 2026, the House debated the agreement. The debate focused on the faster increase of the state pension (AOW) age as outlined in the coalition agreement. With a narrow majority, a motion to prevent the policy was rejected when the SGP and the Markuszower Group voted with the coalition. At the end of the evening, the House passed a motion to appoint Jetten as formateur.

On 5 February, the parties agreed on the distribution of ministers and state secretaries. Of the 18 ministers, seven were provided by D66, six by VVD, and five by CDA. Each party provided three state secretaries, supplemented by Sandra Palmen, who remained as the independent State Secretary for Benefits and Redress. The Ministry of Asylum and Migration, Ministry of Climate Policy and Green Growth and Ministry of Housing and Spatial Planning were merged back into the ministries they were separated from in 2024.

De Volkskrant reported on 16 February that Nathalie van Berkel, the D66 candidate for State Secretary of Finance, had included incorrect information about her education on her CV. Van Berkel subsequently withdrew her candidacy and resigned as member of the House of Representatives, and was replaced as candidate by Eelco Eerenberg.

The incoming cabinet held its constitutive deliberation on 21 February 2026, after which Jetten handed in his final report as formateur. The cabinet was sworn in on 23 February 2026.
