= Van Veldhoven =

van Veldhoven is a Dutch toponymic surname meaning "from Veldhoven". Notable people with the surname include:

- Harm van Veldhoven (born 1962), Dutch-Belgian footballer and manager
- Jos van Veldhoven (born 1952), Dutch choral conductor
- Stientje van Veldhoven (born 1973), Dutch politician
