= Sophie Hermans =

Dutch politician (born 1981)

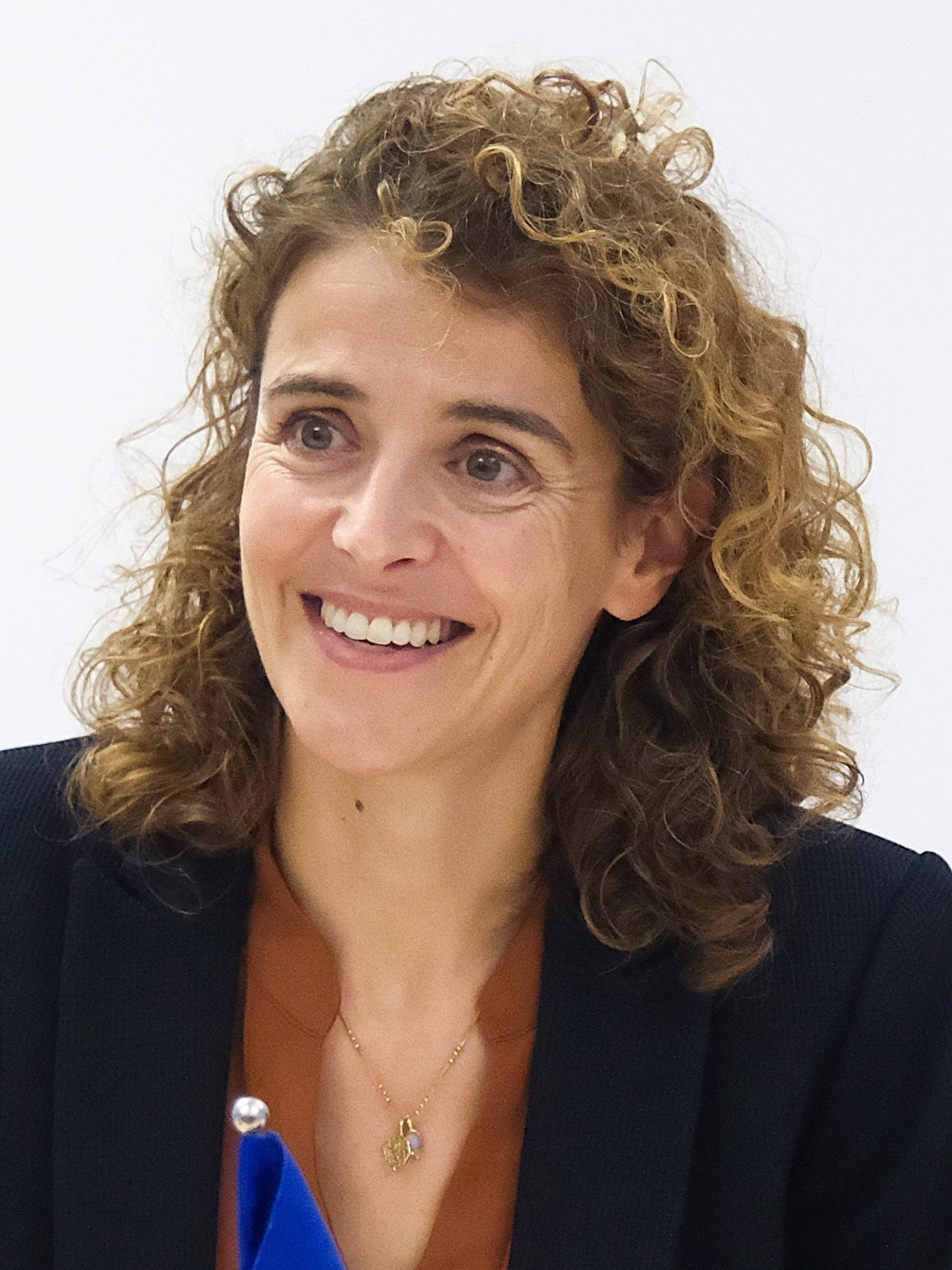
- Hermans in 2024

Minister of Health, Welfare and Sport
- Incumbent
- Assumed office 23 February 2026
- Prime Minister: Rob Jetten
- Preceded by: Jan Anthonie Bruijn

Deputy Prime Minister of the Netherlands
- In office 2 July 2024 – 23 February 2026 Serving with Fleur Agema (2024–2025), Eddy van Hijum (2024–2025), and Mona Keijzer (2024–2026)
- Prime Minister: Dick Schoof

Minister of Climate Policy and Green Growth
- In office 2 July 2024 – 23 February 2026
- Prime Minister: Dick Schoof
- Preceded by: Rob Jetten (as Minister for Climate and Energy Policy)
- Succeeded by: Stientje van Veldhoven

Parliamentary leader in the House of Representatives
- In office 11 January 2022 – 23 November 2023
- Preceded by: Mark Rutte
- Succeeded by: Dilan Yeşilgöz
- Parliamentary group: People's Party for Freedom and Democracy

Member of the House of Representatives
- In office 23 March 2017 – 2 July 2024

Personal details
- Born: Sophia Theodora Monique Hermans; 1 May 1981 (age 45) Nijmegen, Netherlands
- Party: People's Party for Freedom and Democracy
- Parent: Loek Hermans (father)
- Education: University of Amsterdam

Sophia Theodora Monique Hermans (born 1 May 1981) is a Dutch politician currently serving as the minister of health, welfare and sport since 2026 in the Jetten cabinet. She previously served as Deputy Prime Minister of the Netherlands and Minister of Climate and Green Growth in the Schoof cabinet from 2024 to 2026. Hermans also previously served as a member of the House of Representatives representing People's Party for Freedom and Democracy between 2017 and 2024.

== Early life and education ==
Hermans is the daughter of former politician Loek Hermans. She completed her vwo, studied political science in Amsterdam and completed postdoctoral courses at San Francisco State University and London Business School.

== Career ==
Hermans's first job was as a consultant in Utrecht. She served as political assistant to Minister Stef Blok and Prime Minister Mark Rutte.

Hermans entered on the House of Representatives on 23 March 2017, and she was her party's spokesperson for healthcare. She served as deputy parliamentary leader of the VVD. She acted as negotiator during the 2021-2022 cabinet formation. She became parliamentary leader on 11 January 2022, when Rutte resigned from the House to become Prime Minister in his new cabinet. (Note: In the Netherlands, ministers and state secretaries are not members of parliament, with the possible exception of the period between an election and the accession of the new cabinet.)

In June 2022, Hermans held a personal speech at the party congress. She denied owing her position to her father or her work as Rutte's assistant. During a subsequent debate, Geert Wilders (PVV) asked her how long she intended to remain Rutte's "bag bearer" (Dutch: tassendrager). Hermans was moved by this remark. Speaker Vera Bergkamp asked Wilders to stay with the subject-matter. Hermans's response was met with the approval of the chamber, and several other parliamentary leaders condemned Wilders' comment.

In July 2023, in the aftermath of Prime Minister Mark Rutte's resignation from national politics and as leader of the VVD, Hermans declined to run to become the next Leader of the People's Party for Freedom and Democracy. Following the November 2023 general election, she served as spokesperson for AIVD, medical ethics, and long-term care and as acting parliamentary leader of the VVD, while party leader Dilan Yeşilgöz was still demissionary Minister of Justice and Security. Alongside Eelco Heinen, Hermans assisted Yeşilgöz in talks to form a new governing coalition in 2023–24.

After the PVV, VVD, NSC, and BBB formed the Schoof cabinet, Hermans was sworn in as Second Deputy Prime Minister and as Minister of Climate Policy and Green Growth on 2 July 2024. The Ministry of Climate Policy and Green Growth was established simultaneously, and its responsibilities had previously been part of the Ministry of Economic Affairs and Climate Policy with Rob Jetten as minister without portfolio. When past climate change denial by members of the fellow coalition party PVV was raised during her confirmation hearing, Hermans declared that she was committed to climate change mitigation and that she wanted to promote an optimistic message of green growth.

The governing agreement, presented in September 2024, included a continuation of existing plans to increase wind power and the construction of four nuclear power plants. Hermans later warned that it would not be possible to finish the first nuclear plant by 2035, as had been targeted by the preceding cabinet. The Netherlands Environmental Assessment Agency (PBL) concluded the following month that the likelihood of the Netherlands meeting its 2030 target – reducing CO_{2} emissions by 55% compared to 1990 levels – had fallen from 15% to less than 5%, partly due to the cabinet's reversal of its predecessor's measures. Hermans responded that she was working on additional initiatives.

She chaired the 2026 IEA Ministerial and 297th Governing Board session in Paris. She secured commitments to strengthen supply chain resilience, expand recycling initiatives, and enhance market transparency for critical minerals essential to clean energy technologies. She also guided international consensus on modernizing global power grids to ensure stability and resilience while meeting surging energy demands driven by artificial intelligence and data centers.

== Political positions ==
She opposed government efforts to ban laughing gas for recreational use, comparing it to "shooting a mosquito with a cannon". In 2024, Hermans re-introduced a proposal of her party to ban unvaccinated children from attending day care in response to declining vaccination rates and recent cases of the measles and whooping cough.

== Personal life ==
Hermans is in a relationship.

Her sister Caroliene was the political assistant of Dutch prime minister Mark Rutte for various years.

She played hockey.

== Electoral history ==
Electoral history of Sophie Hermans
Year	Body	Party	Pos.	Votes	Result		Ref.
Year	Body	Party	Pos.	Votes	Party seats	Individual	Ref.
2017	House of Representatives	People's Party for Freedom and Democracy	16	4,417	33	Won	
2021	House of Representatives	People's Party for Freedom and Democracy	3	24,115	34	Won	
2023	House of Representatives	People's Party for Freedom and Democracy	2	62,320	24	Won	

== Notes ==
Political offices
Preceded by Rob Jetten as Minister for Climate and Energy Policy	Minister of Climate Policy and Green Growth; 2024–2026	Incumbent
Preceded by Rob Jetten, Karien van Gennip, and Carola Schouten	Deputy Prime Minister; 2024–2026; Served alongside: Fleur Agema (until 2025), Eddy van Hijum (until 2025), and Mona Keijzer	Incumbent
