= Jetten cabinet =

Cabinet of the Netherlands since 2026

- Cabinet of the Netherlands
- Date formed: 23 February 2026

People and organisations
- Prime Minister: Rob Jetten
- Deputy Prime Ministers: Dilan Yeşilgöz; Bart van den Brink
- No. of ministers: 18
- Member parties: D66; VVD; CDA
- Status in legislature: Centre to centre-right minority coalition government

History
- Incoming formation: 2025–2026 formation
- Election: 2025 election
- Legislature terms: 2025–present
- Predecessor: Schoof cabinet

The Jetten cabinet is the current cabinet of the Netherlands. The cabinet was sworn in on 23 February 2026. It is a minority government, formed after the 2025 general election, and consisting of the social liberal Democrats 66 (D66), the conservative liberal People's Party for Freedom and Democracy (VVD) and the Christian democratic and conservative Christian Democratic Appeal (CDA). It is led by Rob Jetten, who serves as Prime Minister of the Netherlands since the formation of the cabinet, and also has served as the leader of the D66 since 12 August 2023. It is the first minority cabinet in the House of Representatives without confidence and supply since 1918.

== Cabinet members ==
Prime minister and deputy prime ministers in the Jetten cabinet
Title	Minister			Term of office	
Title	Image	Name	Party	Start	End
Prime Minister	Rob Jetten	Rob Jetten	D66	23 February 2026	Incumbent
Deputy Prime Minister	Dilan Yeşilgöz	Dilan Yeşilgöz	VVD	23 February 2026	Incumbent
Deputy Prime Minister	Bart van den Brink	Bart van den Brink	CDA	23 February 2026	Incumbent

Ministers in the Jetten cabinet
Title	Minister			Term of office	
Title	Image	Name	Party	Start	End
Minister of General Affairs	Rob Jetten	Rob Jetten	D66	23 February 2026	Incumbent
Minister of Foreign Affairs	Tom Berendsen	Tom Berendsen	CDA	23 February 2026	Incumbent
Minister of Justice and Security	David van Weel	David van Weel	VVD	23 February 2026	Incumbent
Minister of the Interior and Kingdom Relations	Pieter Heerma	Pieter Heerma	CDA	23 February 2026	Incumbent
Minister of Education, Culture and Science	Rianne Letschert	Rianne Letschert	D66	23 February 2026	Incumbent
Minister of Finance	Eelco Heinen	Eelco Heinen	VVD	2 July 2024 (Note: Retained this position from the Schoof cabinet.)	Incumbent
Minister of Defence	Dilan Yeşilgöz	Dilan Yeşilgöz	VVD	23 February 2026	Incumbent
Minister of Infrastructure and Water Management	Vincent Karremans	Vincent Karremans	VVD	23 February 2026	Incumbent
Minister of Economic Affairs and Climate Policy	Heleen Herbert	Heleen Herbert	CDA	23 February 2026	Incumbent
Minister of Agriculture, Fisheries, Food Security and Nature	Jaimi van Essen	Jaimi van Essen	D66	23 February 2026	Incumbent
Minister of Social Affairs and Employment	Hans Vijlbrief	Hans Vijlbrief	D66	23 February 2026	Incumbent
Minister of Health, Welfare and Sport	Sophie Hermans	Sophie Hermans	VVD	23 February 2026	Incumbent

Ministers without portfolio in the Jetten cabinet
Ministry	Portfolio	Minister			Term of office	
Ministry	Portfolio	Image	Name	Party	Start	End
Foreign Affairs	Foreign Trade and Development Cooperation	Sjoerd Sjoerdsma	Sjoerd Sjoerdsma	D66	23 February 2026	Incumbent
Justice and Security	Asylum and Migration	Bart van den Brink	Bart van den Brink	CDA	23 February 2026	Incumbent
Interior and Kingdom Relations	Housing and Spatial Planning	Elanor Boekholt-O'Sullivan	Elanor Boekholt-O'Sullivan	D66	23 February 2026	Incumbent
Economic Affairs and Climate Policy	Climate Policy and Green Growth		Stientje van Veldhoven	D66	23 February 2026	Incumbent
Social Affairs and Employment	Work and Participation	Thierry Aartsen	Thierry Aartsen	VVD	23 February 2026	Incumbent
Health, Welfare and Sport	Long-term Care, Youth and Sport	Mirjam Sterk	Mirjam Sterk	CDA	23 February 2026	Incumbent

State secretaries in the Jetten cabinet
Ministry	Portfolio	State secretary			Term of office	
Ministry	Portfolio	Image	Name	Party	Start	End
Justice and Security	Legal Protection and Prisons	Claudia van Bruggen	Claudia van Bruggen	D66	23 February 2026	Incumbent
Interior and Kingdom Relations	Kingdom Relations and Effective Government	Eric van der Burg	Eric van der Burg	VVD	23 February 2026	Incumbent
Education, Culture and Science	Primary and Secondary Education and Equal Opportunities	Judith Tielen	Judith Tielen	VVD	23 February 2026	Incumbent
Finance	Tax Affairs, Tax Administration and Customs		Eelco Eerenberg	D66	23 February 2026	Incumbent
Finance	Benefits Redress		Sandra Palmen	Indep. (Note: To ensure stability in the redress for the childcare benefits scandal, Palmen was asked by D66, VVD and CDA to retain her position, which she previously held on behalf of New Social Contract, and later as an independent politician.)	5 September 2025	Incumbent
Defence	Arms Procurement and Personnel	Derk Boswijk	Derk Boswijk	CDA	23 February 2026	Incumbent
Infrastructure and Water Management	Environment and Public Transport	Annet Bertram	Annet Bertram	CDA	23 February 2026	Incumbent
Economic Affairs and Climate Policy	Digital Economy and Digital Sovereignty	Willemijn Aerdts	Willemijn Aerdts	D66	23 February 2026	Incumbent
Economic Affairs and Climate Policy	Climate Policy and Green Growth	Jo-Annes de Bat	Jo-Annes de Bat	CDA	23 February 2026	Incumbent
Agriculture, Fisheries, Food Security and Nature	Food Security, Fisheries and Horticulture	Silvio Erkens	Silvio Erkens	VVD	23 February 2026	Incumbent
