= Annet Bertram =

Dutch sociologist and politician (born 1959)

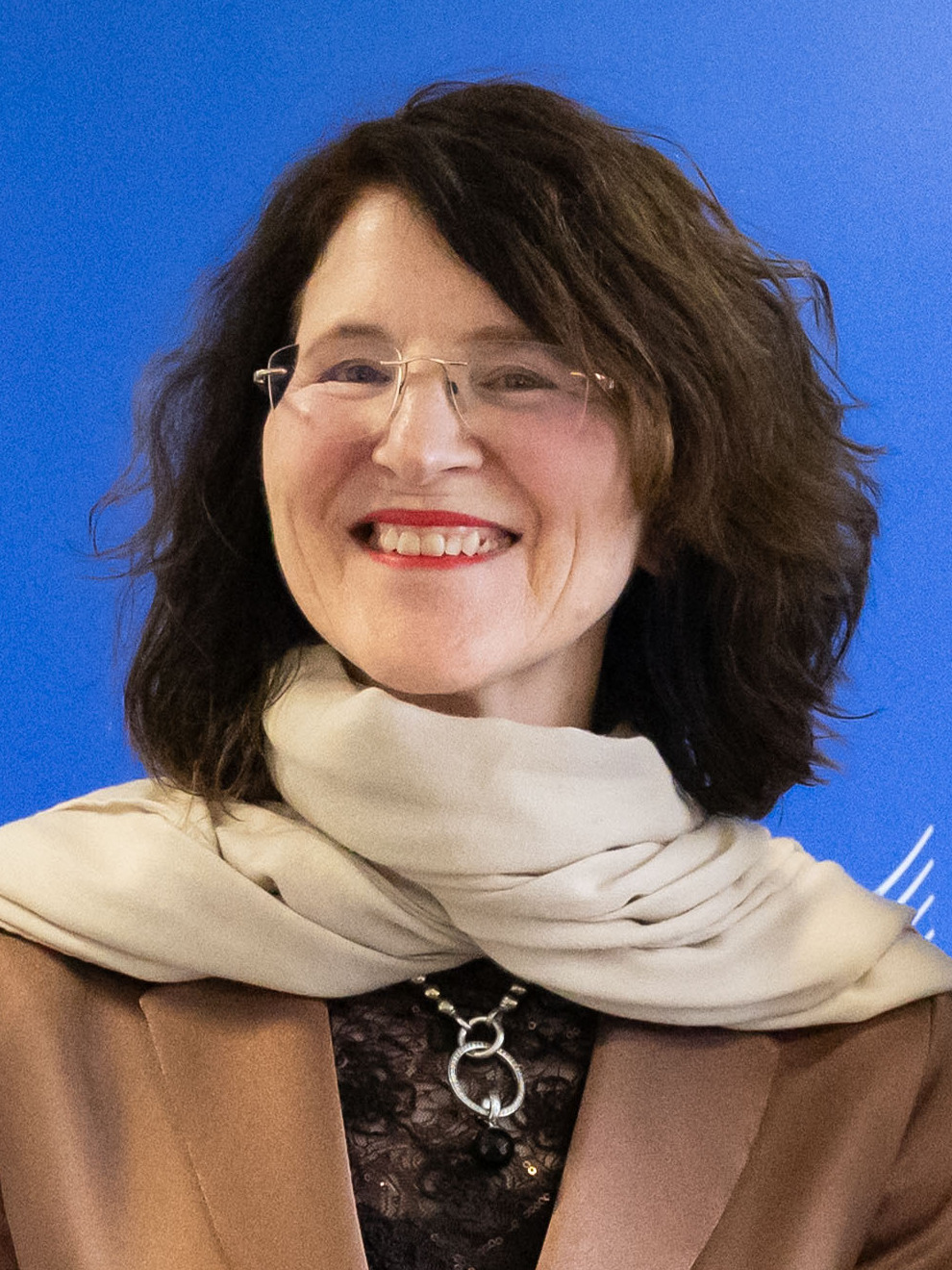
- Annet Bertram in 2026

State Secretary for Infrastructure and Water Management
- Incumbent
- Assumed office 23 February 2026

Personal details
- Born: 1959 (age 66–67) Netherlands
- Party: Christian Democratic Appeal
- Education: Leiden University

Annet Wilhelmina Hendrika Bertram (born 1959) is a Dutch senior civil servant and politician for the Christian Democratic Appeal (CDA) party. On 1 April 2025, she was appointed Secretary-General of the Ministry of Asylum and Migration, a position she combined with the role of Director-General of Migration. In February 2026, it was announced that the CDA intends to nominate her as State Secretary in the Ministry of Infrastructure and Water Management in the proposed Jetten cabinet.

== Education ==
Bertram studied sociology and law at Leiden University.

== Career ==
Bertram worked at the then Ministry of Housing, Spatial Planning and the Environment in various positions, including (Deputy) Director-General of Housing and Director of the Accounts and Administration Centre.

In 2007 she became municipal secretary of The Hague. From 1 April 2015 she combined this position with the secretariat-general of the Rotterdam–The Hague metropolitan region.

In 2017, Bertram was appointed Director General of Real Estate and Government Operations and Director General of the Central Government Real Estate Agency at the Ministry of the Interior and Kingdom Relations. The appointment took effect on 15 November 2017. In 2022, it was announced that she would become Director General of Migration at the Ministry of Justice and Security, with a starting date of 1 January 2023 at the latest.

On 1 April 2025, the Cabinet appointed her as Secretary General of the Ministry of Asylum and Migration, in combination with her position as Director General of Migration.

== Political career ==
In February 2026, the CDA announced that it wanted to nominate Bertram as State Secretary for Infrastructure and Water Management in the proposed Jetten cabinet.
