= Ministry of Climate Policy and Green Growth =

Former government ministry of the Netherlands

- Ministerie van Klimaat en Groene Groei
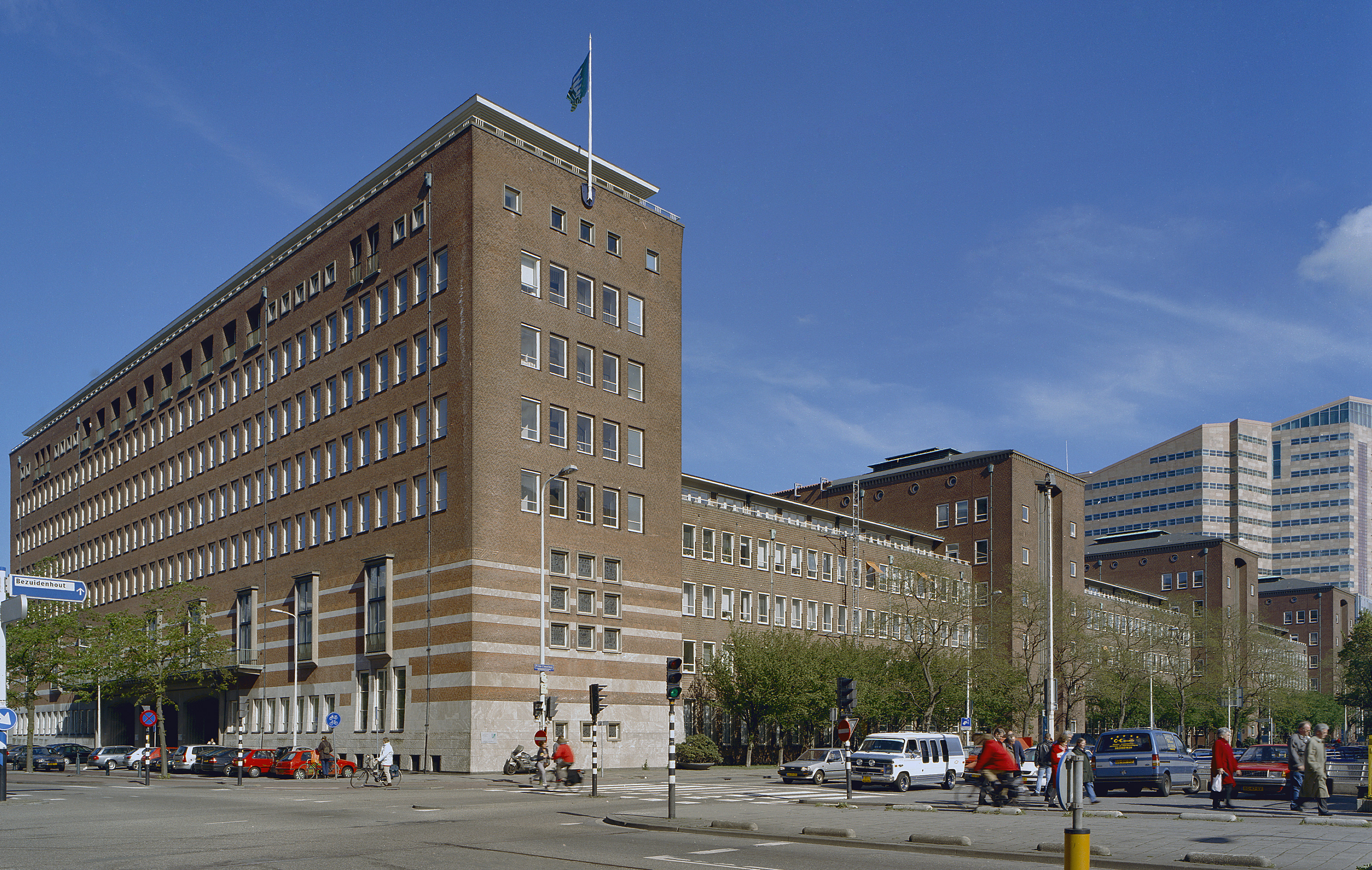
- Head office

Ministry overview
- Formed: 2 July 2024
- Preceding ministry: Ministry of Economic Affairs and Climate Policy
- Dissolved: 23 February 2026
- Superseding ministry: Ministry of Economic Affairs and Climate Policy
- Jurisdiction: Netherlands
- Headquarters: Bezuidenhoutseweg 73, The Hague
- Minister responsible: Sophie Hermans, Minister of Climate Policy and Green Growth

The Ministry of Climate Policy and Green Growth (Dutch: Ministerie van Klimaat en Groene Groei; abbreviated KGG) was a Dutch ministry, which existed between 2024 and 2026. The ministry was spun off from the Ministry of Economic Affairs and Climate Policy on 2 July 2024, when the Schoof cabinet was installed. "Climate Policy" was simultaneously dropped from that ministry's name. The coalition agreement included budget cuts to the civil service, and it was decided that the new ministry would remain located in an office building shared with the Ministry of Economic Affairs. The ministry's responsibilities mostly coincided with those previously overseen by the Minister for Climate and Energy Policy, a minister without portfolio.

Sophie Hermans of the People's Party for Freedom and Democracy (VVD) headed the ministry as Minister of Climate Policy and Green Growth. When the Jetten cabinet took office on 23 February 2026, the ministry was merged back into the Ministry of Economic Affairs.

== See also ==
- List of ministers of climate policy of the Netherlands
