= Eelco Eerenberg =

Dutch politician (born 1984)

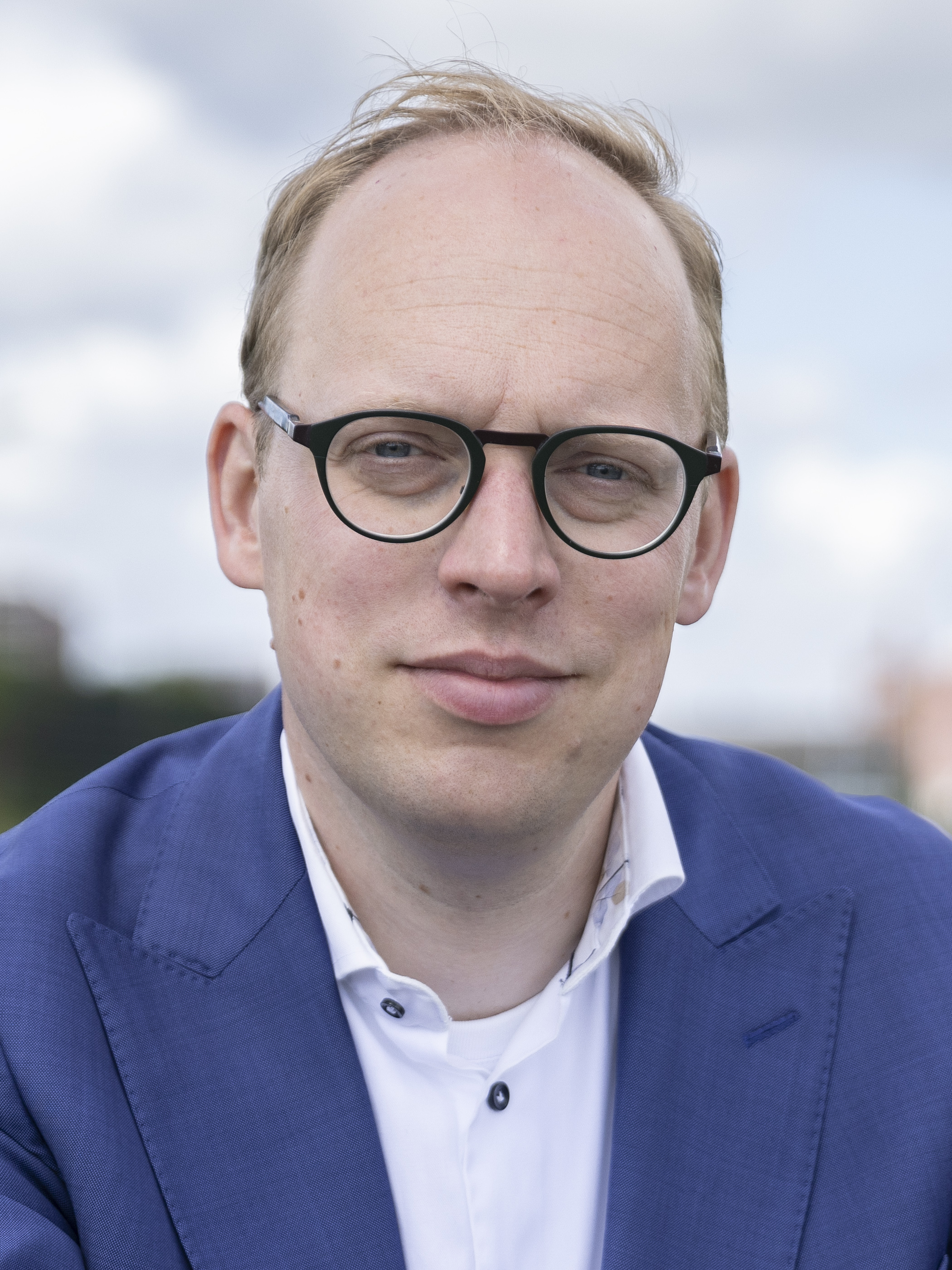
- Eelco Eerenberg in 2022

State Secretary for Tax Affairs
- Incumbent
- Assumed office 23 February 2026
- Prime Minister: Rob Jetten
- Preceded by: Eugène Heijnen

Personal details
- Born: 11 April 1984 (age 42) Hilversum, Netherlands
- Party: Democrats 66
- Education: University of Twente

Eelco Eerenberg (born 11 April 1984) is a Dutch politician and administrator. On behalf of D66, he has been State Secretary for Tax affairs at the Ministry of Finance in the Jetten cabinet since 23 February 2026.

== Social career ==
=== Studies ===
Eerenberg grew up in Hilversum, where he attended the Municipal Gymnasium. In 2002, he began studying technical computer science at the University of Twente. In 2006, he completed his bachelor's degree with honors. In 2011, he completed his master's degree in computer science at the same university, also with honors. He was a board member of the study association ICTSV Inter- Actief, where he was appointed an honorary member in 2008. He was also a board member of the Study Association Consultation.

=== Career ===
From 2006 to 2010, Eerenberg worked as a talent scout at YER. After graduating, Eerenberg founded his own company, where he developed web applications and websites. From 2011 to 2014, he worked as a strategy consultant at Thaesis, where he became a partner in 2014.

=== Secondary functions ===
From 2004 to 2006, Eerenberg was secretary of the board of D66 in Enschede. From September 2016 to December 2019, he was chairman of the board of the Pioneering Foundation. From 1 December 2022 to 23 February 2026, he was a member of the supervisory board of the Pharos Foundation. He was an observer on the board of the MIND Us Foundation until 23 February 2026.

== Political career ==
=== Enschede ===
After serving as a dual council member and faction representative from 2006 to 2010, Eerenberg became a full member of the Enschede municipal council from 2010 onwards for D66. He represented his faction on district-based projects, mobility, governance, and the living environment. He also chaired the South district committee and was a member of the East district committee . He was deputy faction leader for D66. After D66 became the largest party in Enschede in the 2014 municipal elections, Eerenberg was nominated as alderman. In a council comprising Burgerbelangen Enschede, CDA, VVD en Christian Union, he was responsible for finance, education, youth care, sustainability, and the Centrum district. He also served as first deputy mayor.

Eerenberg served as deputy mayor in Enschede on two occasions. First, after Peter den Oudsten left as mayor in 2014, and later after the departure of acting mayor Fred de Graaf in 2015. Eerenberg also holds various secondary positions in his role as alderman. In January 2016, Eerenberg was named Best Young Local Government Member by Binnenlands Bestuur for his "clear and transparent communication and the speed with which he removes points of contention from a file and brings parties together".

=== Utrecht ===
On December 19, 2019, Eerenberg became an alderman in Utrecht. His portfolio included public health, youth and youth care, the station area, the environment and zero-emission transport, and real estate. He is also the district alderman for the Leidsche Rijn district. He also moved from Enschede to Utrecht. In February 2022, Eerenberg was voted Best Young Administrator for the second time by Binnenlands Bestuur, partly for "the speed with which he 'removes points of contention from a file and brings parties together'". From 9 June 2022, to February 23, 2026, he was again an alderman there, with his portfolios including spatial development, education, public health, Groot Merwede, Rijnenburg, and the district alderman for the Leidsche Rijn district.

=== Jetten cabinet ===
On 23 February 2026, Eerenberg became State Secretary for Tax affairs at the Ministry of Finance in the Jetten cabinet.

== Personal career ==
Eerenberg is married and has three children.
