= Robin van Leijen =

Dutch politician (born 1985)

Member of the House of Representatives
- Incumbent
- Assumed office 25 February 2026
- Preceded by: Rob Jetten

Personal details
- Born: Robin Matthijs van Leijen; 2 August 1985 (age 41) Schiedam, Netherlands
- Party: Democrats 66

Robin Matthijs van Leijen (born 2 August 1985) is a Dutch politician serving as a member of the House of Representatives since 2026. From 2021 to 2026, he served as secretary of the Democrats 66 (D66) in Maassluis.
