= Jo-Annes de Bat =

Dutch politician (born 1980)

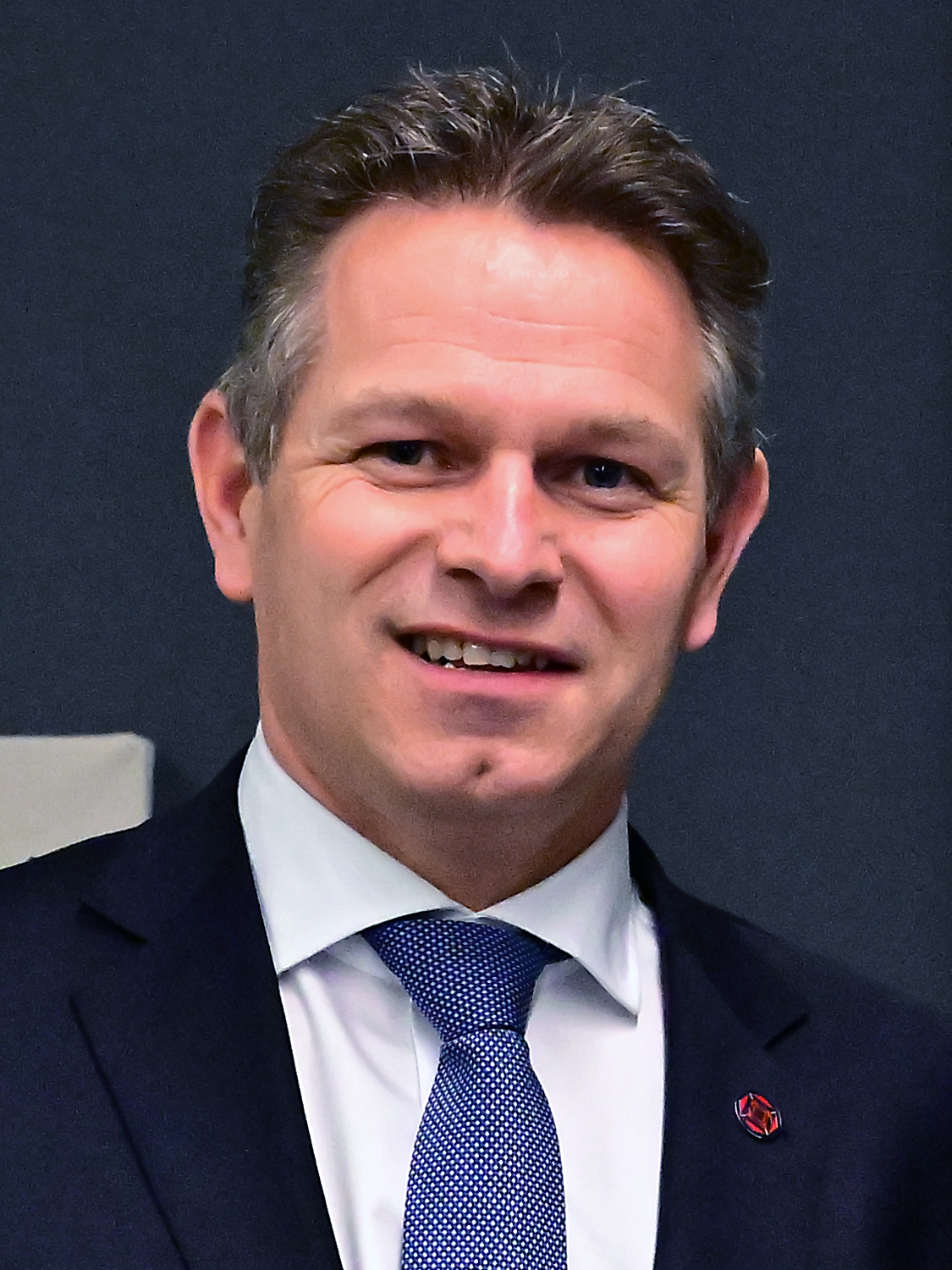
- De Bat in 2026

State Secretary of Climate Policy and Green Growth
- Incumbent
- Assumed office 23 February 2026

Personal details
- Born: 9 May 1980 (age 46) Kloetinge, Netherlands
- Party: Christian Democratic Appeal
- Education: Erasmus University Rotterdam

Jo-Annes de Bat (born 9 May 1980) is a Dutch politician for the CDA party. Since 2026, he has been State Secretary for Climate and Green Growth, part of the Ministry of Economic Affairs and Climate Policy.

== Biography ==
After completing a master's degree in public administration at Erasmus University Rotterdam, De Bat worked as a faction staff member for the CDA provincial faction in Zeeland from 2003 to 2007. He was then director of the CDA Board Members' Association in The Hague from 2007 to 2010.

From 2006 to 2010, De Bat was a councillor in Goes and from 2010 to 2015 an alderman. From 2015 to 2026, he was a member of the Provincial Executive of Zeeland and also served as the second acting King's Commissioner. He also led the CDA party in the 2019 and 2023 provincial elections in Zeeland, securing a seat there during his outgoing term as a provincial executive.

On 23 February 2026, De Bat was sworn in as State Secretary for Climate and Green Growth in the Jetten cabinet.

== Personal life ==
De Bat lives in Kloetinge, is married and has three children.
