= Ministry of Infrastructure and Water Management =

Government ministry of the Netherlands

- Dutch: Ministerie van Infrastructuur en Waterstaat
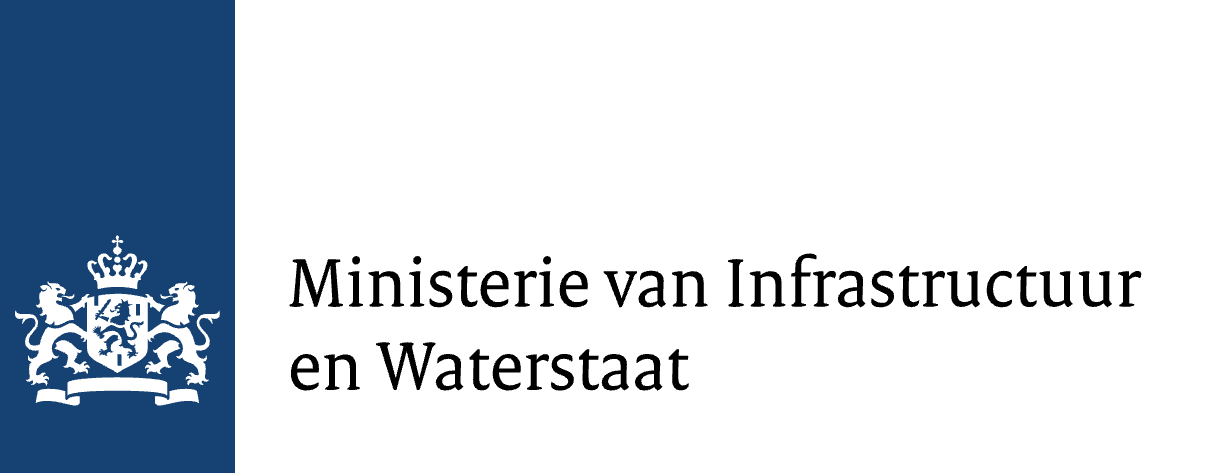

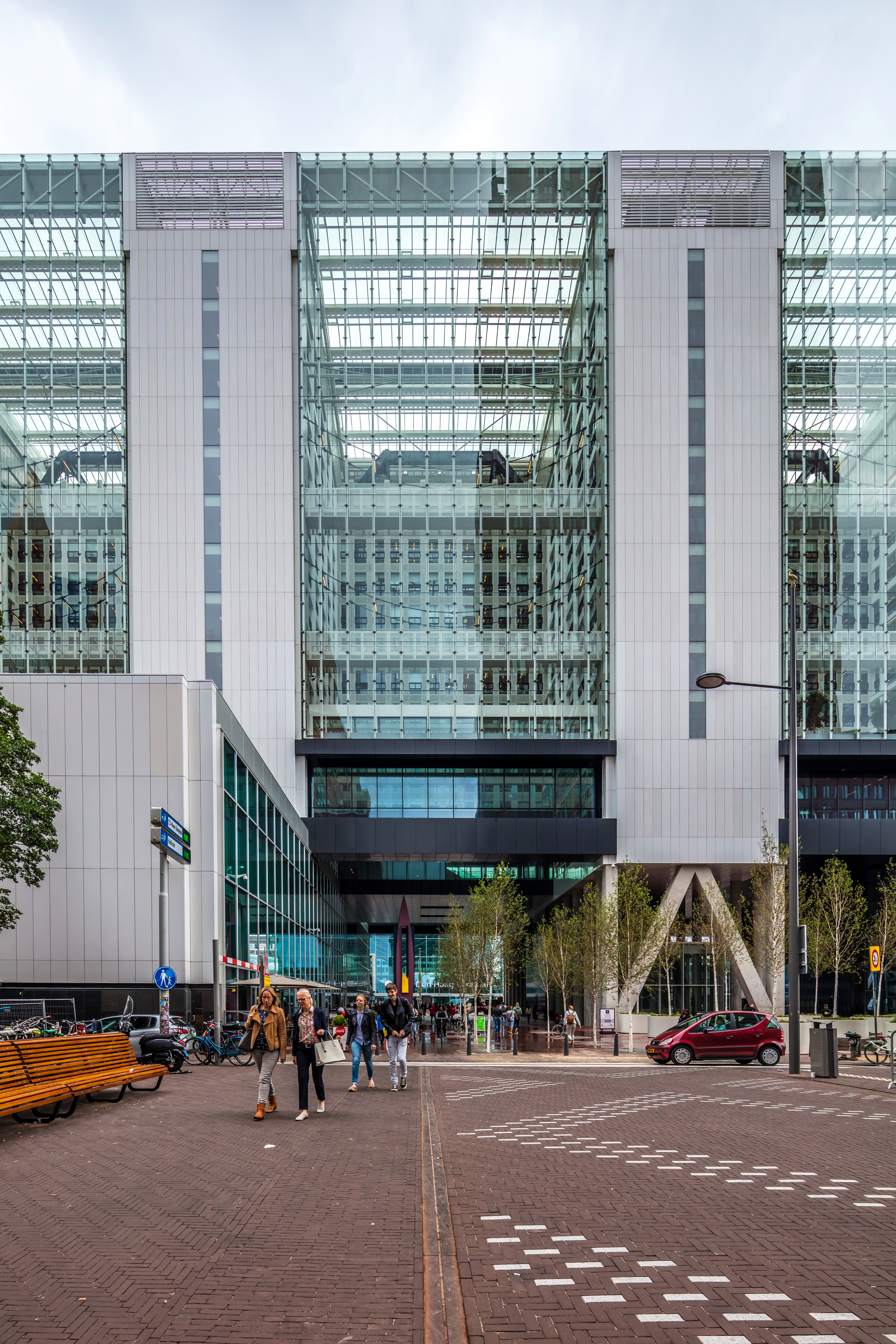
- Building of the Ministry of Infrastructure and Water Management

Department overview
- Formed: 14 October 2010; 15 years ago
- Jurisdiction: Kingdom of the Netherlands
- Headquarters: Rijnstraat 8, The Hague, Netherlands
- Annual budget: €15,7 billion (2018)
- Minister responsible: Vincent Karremans, Minister of Infrastructure and Water Management
- Deputy Minister responsible: Annet Bertram, State Secretary for Infrastructure and Water Management
- Department executive: Jan Hendrik Dronkers, Secretary-General
- Website: Ministry of Infrastructure and Water Management

The Ministry of Infrastructure and Water Management (Dutch: Ministerie van Infrastructuur en Waterstaat; I&W) is the Dutch Ministry responsible for transport, aviation, public works, land management and water resource management. The Ministry was created in 2010 as the Ministry of Infrastructure and the Environment following the merger of the Ministry of Transport and Water Management and the Ministry of Housing, Spatial Planning and Environment. In 2017, the Ministry was renamed the Ministry of Infrastructure and Water Management and the responsibilities for environmental policy and climate change policy were transferred to the Ministry of Economic Affairs.

The Minister of Infrastructure and Water Management (Dutch: Minister van Infrastructuur en Waterstaat) is the head of the Ministry and a member of the Cabinet of the Netherlands. The current Minister is Vincent Karremans, serving since February 2026.

== Organisation ==
The Ministry currently has two Government Agencies and three Directorates:

Government Agencies			Responsibilities
Ministry of Infrastructure and Water Management	Rijkswaterstaat	RWS	Public infrastructure • Water Management
Ministry of Infrastructure and Water Management	Meteorological Institute (Dutch: Meteorologisch Instituut)	KNMI	Weather forecasting

- Directorate for Mobility and Transport (DGB)
- Directorate for Spatial Development and Water Affairs (DGRW)
- Directorate for Knowledge, Innovation and Strategy

== See also ==
- List of ministers of infrastructure of the Netherlands
