= Rob Jetten =

Prime Minister of the Netherlands since 2026

His Excellency Rob Jetten
- Jetten in 2026

Prime Minister of the Netherlands
- Incumbent
- Assumed office 23 February 2026
- Monarch: Willem-Alexander
- Deputy: Dilan Yeşilgöz; Bart van den Brink
- Preceded by: Dick Schoof

Leader of the Democrats 66
- Incumbent
- Assumed office 12 August 2023
- Preceded by: Sigrid Kaag
Ministerial offices
First Deputy Prime Minister of the Netherlands
In office 8 January 2024 – 2 July 2024
Prime Minister	Mark Rutte
Preceded by	Sigrid Kaag
Succeeded by	Fleur Agema
Minister for Climate and Energy Policy
In office 10 January 2022 – 2 July 2024
Prime Minister	Mark Rutte
Preceded by	Office established
Succeeded by	Sophie Hermans (as Minister of Climate and Green Growth)
Party political offices
Leader of the Democrats 66 in the House of Representatives
In office 6 December 2023 – 23 February 2026
Preceded by	Jan Paternotte
In office 9 October 2018 – 28 September 2021
Preceded by	Alexander Pechtold
Succeeded by	Sigrid Kaag
President of the Young Democrats
In office October 2008 – October 2009
Preceded by	Floris Kreiken
Succeeded by	Thomas Bakker

Member of the House of Representatives
- In office 6 December 2023 – 23 February 2026
- Succeeded by: Robin van Leijen
- In office 23 March 2017 – 10 January 2022

Member of the Nijmegen Municipal Council
- In office 11 March 2010 – 29 March 2017

Personal details
- Born: Rob Arnoldus Adrianus Jetten; 25 March 1987 (age 39) Veghel, Netherlands
- Party: Democrats 66
- Domestic partner: Nicolás Keenan (engaged)
- Education: Radboud University (BA, MA)

Rob Arnoldus Adrianus Jetten (Dutch: [ˈrɔp ˈjɛtə(n)]; born 25 March 1987) is a Dutch politician who has served as prime minister of the Netherlands since February 2026. He has also served as leader of the Democrats 66 (D66) since August 2023. Previously, he served in the fourth Rutte cabinet as Minister for Climate and Energy Policy from 2022 to 2024 and as First Deputy Prime Minister of the Netherlands in 2024.

Jetten began his political career as a policy advisor for D66 and as chair of the Young Democrats, and served in the municipal council of Nijmegen from 2010 to 2017. He was also elected to the House of Representatives in the 2017 general election and was chosen as D66's youngest-ever parliamentary leader in 2018. Following the resignation of Sigrid Kaag, Jetten became D66's leader ahead of the 2023 general election, in which D66 lost several seats, forcing them into opposition.

Jetten replaced Kaag as the outgoing First Deputy Prime Minister in 2024. In the 2025 general election, Jetten led D66 to its best-ever general election result as D66 became the joint-largest party in parliament. A four-month cabinet formation led to the minority Jetten cabinet in February 2026, which made Jetten the youngest person, and the first politician from D66 to serve as Prime Minister of the Netherlands.

== Early life and education ==
Rob Arnoldus Adrianus Jetten was born on 25 March 1987 in Veghel, North Brabant, Netherlands, and grew up in Uden. He received his secondary education at Udens College between 1999 and 2005. He then studied at Radboud University between 2005 and 2011, where he obtained a BA and an MA in public administration. After a period as a management trainee at the Dutch railway authority ProRail, he continued working there as a consultant and as a regional supply manager for the northeastern Netherlands.

== Political career ==
=== Early career ===
Jetten began his political career as a policy advisor for the Democrats 66 (D66) parliamentary group in the Senate of the States General and as the chairman of the Young Democrats. In addition, between 2010 and 2017, he was a member of the municipal council of Nijmegen. In the 2017 general election, he was elected as a member of the House of Representatives. Jetten then became his party's spokesperson for climate, energy and gas, railways, democratic renewal and economic affairs.

On 9 October 2018, Jetten was chosen as the new parliamentary leader of D66 in the House of Representatives, succeeding Alexander Pechtold. This did not automatically make him the new party leader as the new leader eventually was to be chosen in the 2020 Democrats 66 leadership election. Aged 31, Jetten became the youngest-ever parliamentary leader of D66. After his election, Jetten faced criticism in Dutch media because of his relatively young age. He was nicknamed Robot Jetten due to his rehearsed answers.

In June 2020, Jetten announced that he would not submit a candidacy for the position of party leader, naming Sigrid Kaag as a better candidate. He was instead put in second place on D66's candidate list. When the fourth Rutte cabinet was sworn in on 10 January 2022, Jetten became Minister for Climate and Energy Policy. Under his leadership, the Dutch government announced plans in 2022 to invest 750 million euros ($789 million) through to 2031 to have the country's gas network operator Gasunie develop a national hydrogen transportation network.

=== Party leader ===
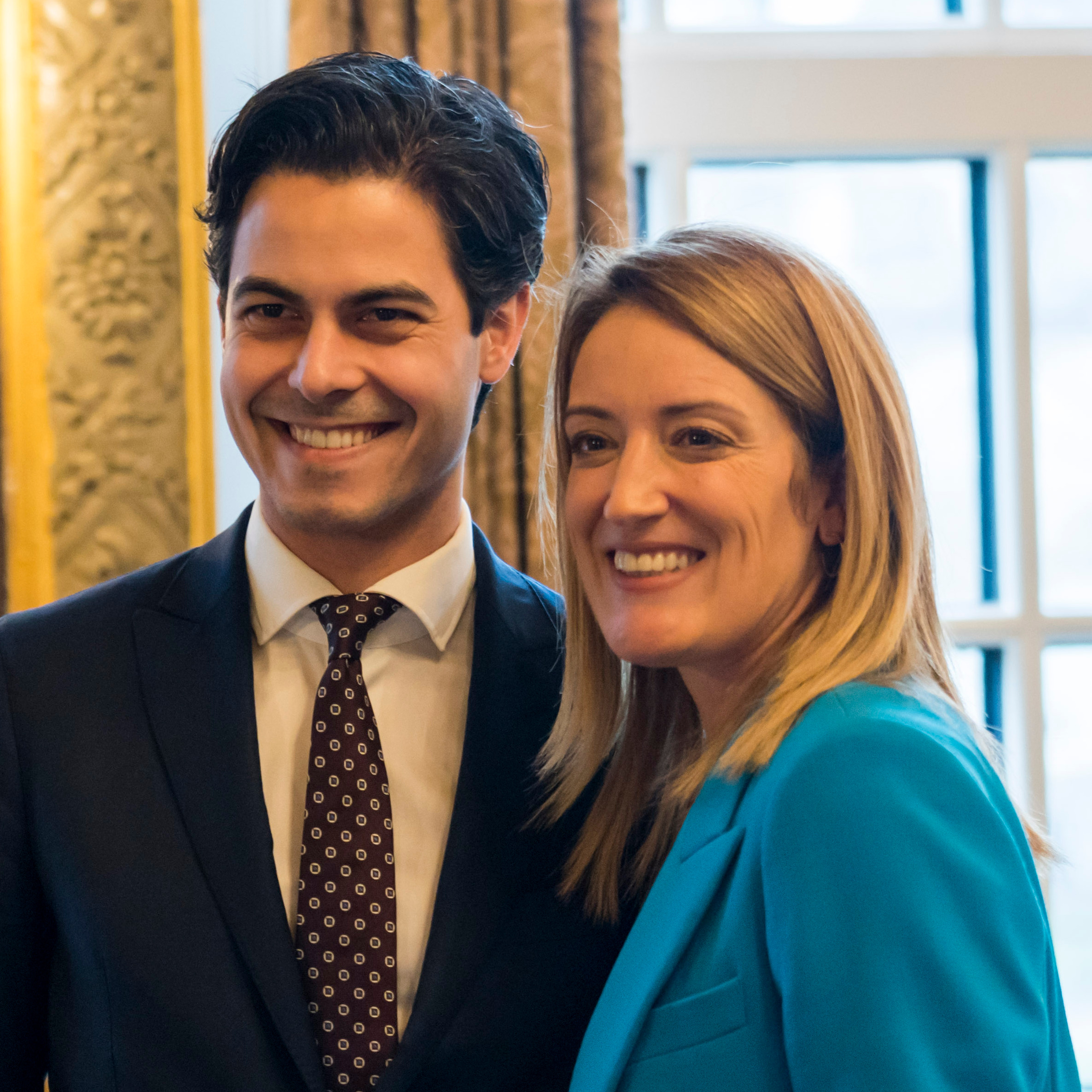
Jetten with European Parliament President Roberta Metsola in 2023

On 14 July 2023, Jetten announced his candidacy to become the next leader of the D66. He succeeded Sigrid Kaag after she announced that she would not lead D66 into the 2023 general election, due to the impact of the "hate, intimidation and threats" she received against her family. Jetten returned to the House of Representatives as parliamentary leader after the election, in which D66 obtained 9 seats, a loss of 24. Following Kaag's resignation effective 8 January 2024 to fill a role at the United Nations, Jetten took over her position as Deputy Prime Minister, and he served as acting Minister of Finance for four days. However, his tasks for the latter were in practice delegated to State Secretary for Finance Marnix van Rij.

Jetten's term as minister ended on 2 July 2024, when the Schoof cabinet was sworn in. When that cabinet presented its 2025 budget which included €2 billion in education cuts, Jetten formed the self-named "unholy alliance" with centrist and conservative opposition parties. Coalition parties needed additional support in the Senate, but D66 pulled out of negotiations in early December 2024, a week before an agreement was reached to reverse €750 million of the cuts. During the Russian invasion of Ukraine, he advocated for Dutch defense spending to rise from 2% to 3% of gross domestic product, believing that Europe could no longer rely on the United States for its security following the second inauguration of US president Donald Trump in 2025.

In the 2025 general election, Jetten's Democrats 66 (D66) and the right-wing populist Party for Freedom (PVV) ended up jointly being the largest parties, each winning 26 seats in the House. D66 experienced their best-ever result in general elections. Jetten was credited for his optimism during the campaign. In the following cabinet formation, D66 agreed to form a minority cabinet with the People's Party for Freedom and Democracy (VVD) and the Christian Democratic Appeal (CDA).

== Prime Minister of the Netherlands (2026–present) ==
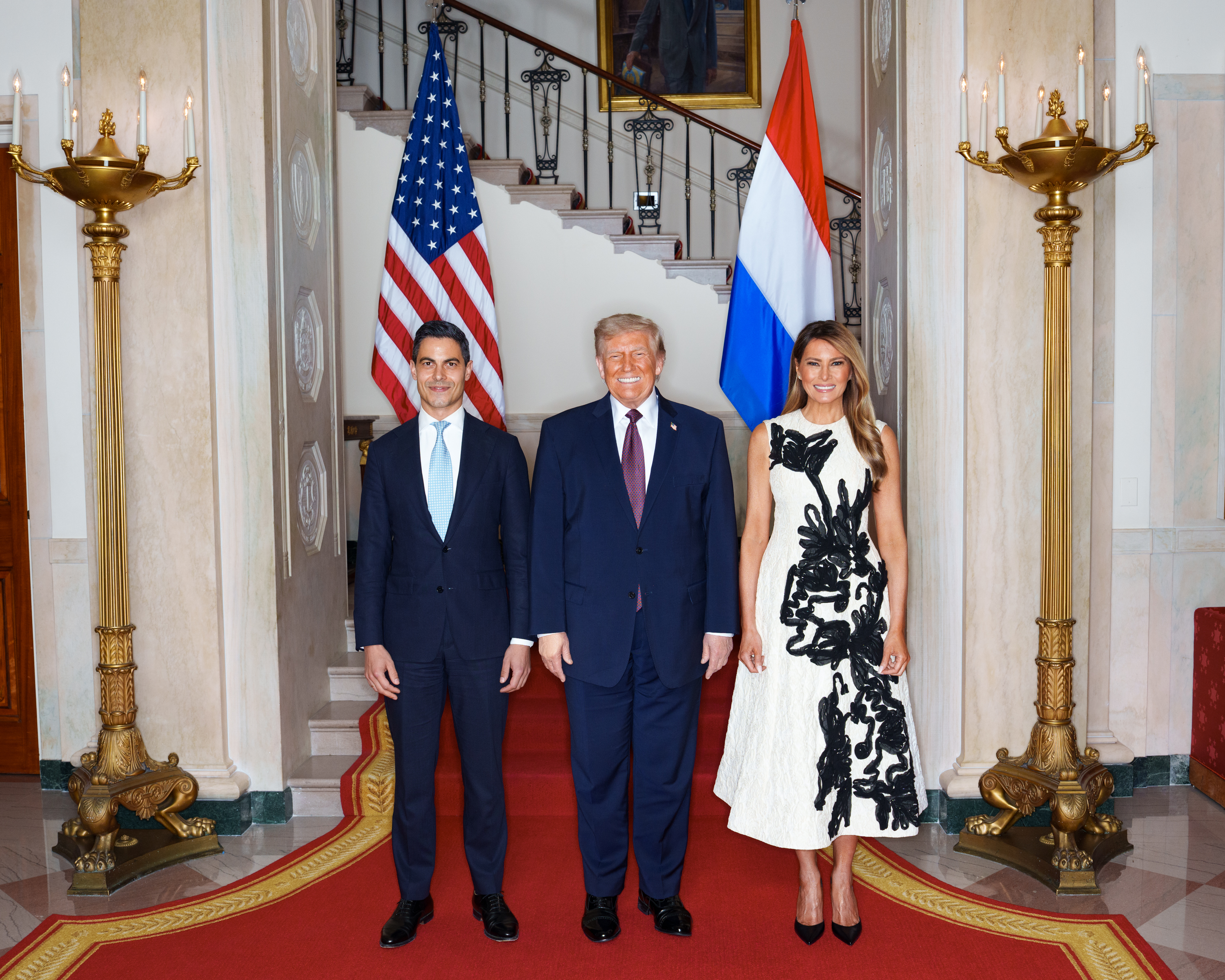
Jetten alongside US President Donald Trump and First Lady Melania Trump, 13 April 2026

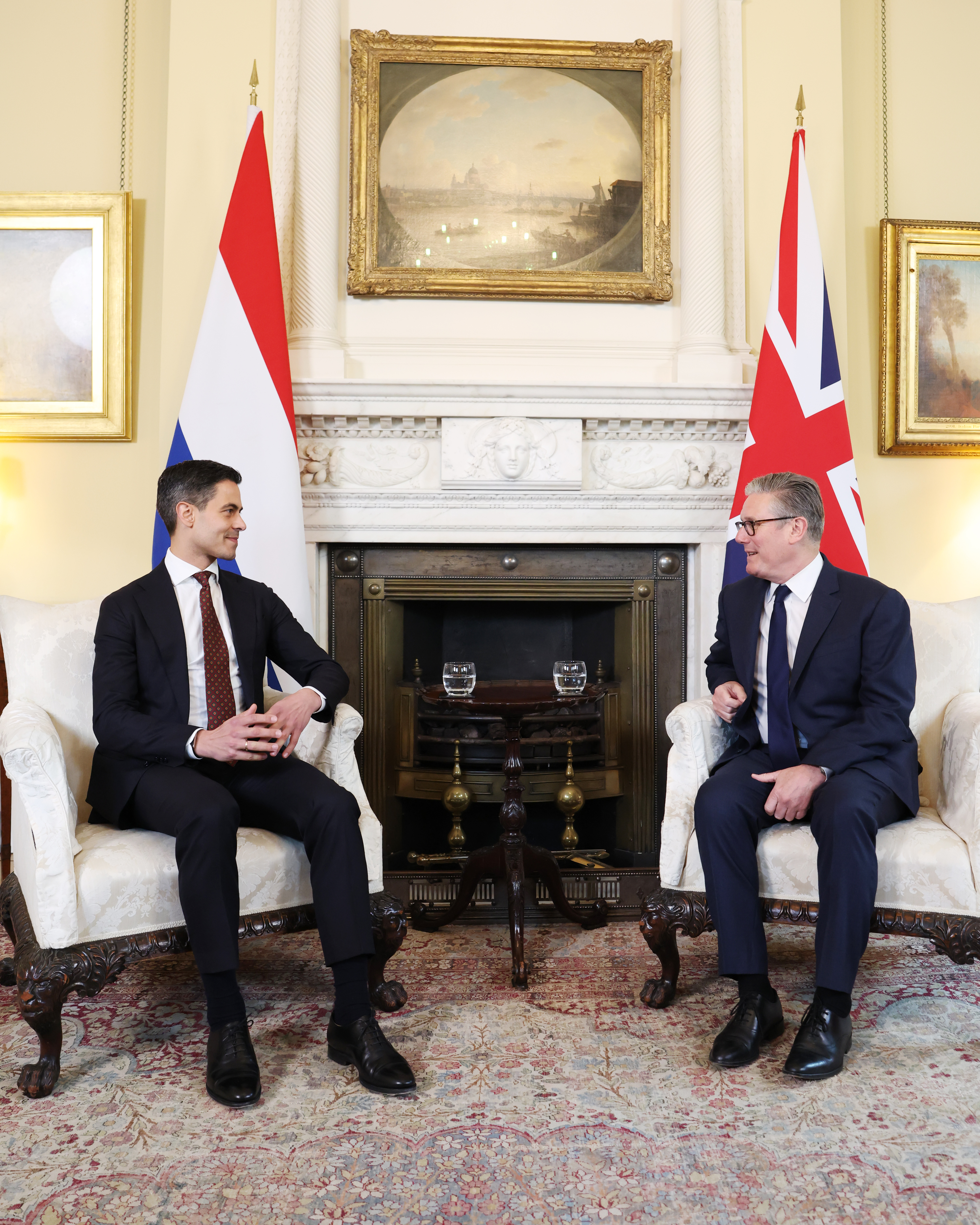
Jetten with UK Prime Minister Keir Starmer, 14 April 2026

=== Appointment ===
Jetten was appointed as formateur on 3 February 2026. Debate in the legislature before his appointment as formateur focused on the proposed plans of his proposed parliamentary coalition to increase the age for the Algemene Ouderdomswet. The minority Jetten cabinet was inaugurated on 23 February 2026, which made Jetten the youngest person, the first openly gay man and the first openly LGBT person, and the first politician from the Democrats 66 party to serve as Prime Minister of the Netherlands.

=== Coalition ===
The coalition agreement, entitled "Aan de slag!" (meaning "Down to work!"), promises "a better climate for investment" and tax measures favourable to businesses. Citizens, for their part, will be required to pay a "freedom contribution", a new tax intended to finance the increase in military spending. The government of Jetten also announced cuts to social spending, particularly in the healthcare budget, the reduction of the duration of unemployment benefits from 24 to 12 months, and lower benefits paid to people who are unable to work. The conditions for qualifying for a full pension will be tightened, and the retirement age could be raised to 70. The prime minister also promised the construction of new cities to address the housing crisis, as well as the building of nuclear power plants.

Following US–Israeli strikes on Iran in 2026, Jetten maintained a critical stance toward Tehran, calling for an end to Iranian military activities and expressing 'deep concern' over the regime's internal repression and its role in regional escalation.

== Personal life ==
Jetten with NYC Mayor Zohran Mamdani.

Jetten has been in a relationship with Argentine field hockey player Nicolás Keenan since 2022. They announced their engagement in November 2024. In October 2026, Jetten and Keenan announced they were expecting a child born via surrogacy.

== Electoral history ==
Electoral history of Rob Jetten
Year	Body	Party	Pos.	Votes	Result		Ref.
Year	Body	Party	Pos.	Votes	Party seats	Individual	Ref.
2017	House of Representatives	Democrats 66	12	4,903	19	Won	
2021	House of Representatives	Democrats 66	2	45,771	24	Won	
2023	House of Representatives	Democrats 66	1	437,371	9	Won	
2025	House of Representatives	Democrats 66	1	1,209,849	26	Won	

== Honours ==
National honours

- Officer of the Order of Orange-Nassau (2 September 2024)

Foreign honours

- Spain: Grand Cross of the Order of Civil Merit (9 April 2024)
- Japan: Grand Cordon of the Order of the Rising Sun (17 June 2026)

Political offices
New ministerial post	Minister of Climate and Energy Policy; 2022–2024	Succeeded by Sophie Hermans as Minister of Climate Policy and Green Growth
Preceded by Sigrid Kaag	First Deputy Prime Minister of the Netherlands; 2024	Succeeded by Fleur Agema
Preceded by Sigrid Kaag	Minister of Finance (Acting); 2024	Succeeded by Steven van Weyenberg
Preceded by Dick Schoof	Prime Minister of the Netherlands; 2026–present	Incumbent
Party political offices
Preceded by Sigrid Kaag	Leader of the Democrats 66; 2023–present	Incumbent
