= Dilan Yeşilgöz =

Dutch politician (born 1977)

Her Excellency Dilan Yeşilgöz
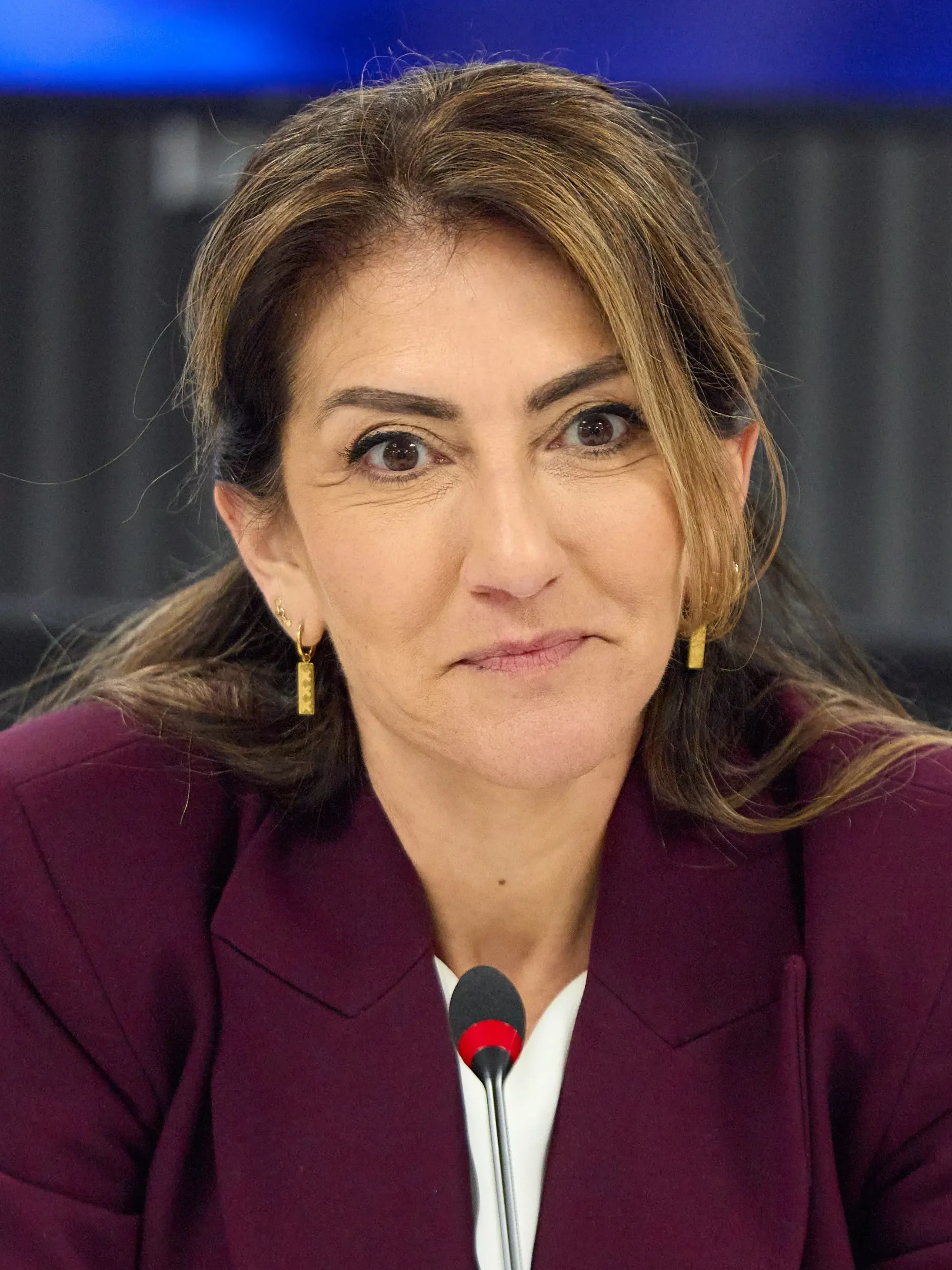
- Yeşilgöz in 2026

Deputy Prime Minister of the Netherlands
- Incumbent
- Assumed office 23 February 2026 Serving with Bart van den Brink
- Prime Minister: Rob Jetten

Minister of Defence
- Incumbent
- Assumed office 23 February 2026
- Prime Minister: Rob Jetten
- Preceded by: Ruben Brekelmans

Leader of the People's Party for Freedom and Democracy
- Incumbent
- Assumed office 14 August 2023
- Preceded by: Mark Rutte

Minister of Justice and Security
- In office 10 January 2022 – 2 July 2024
- Prime Minister: Mark Rutte
- Preceded by: Ferdinand Grapperhaus
- Succeeded by: David van Weel

State Secretary for Economic Affairs and Climate Policy
- In office 25 May 2021 – 10 January 2022 Serving with Mona Keijzer (2021)
- Prime Minister: Mark Rutte
- Preceded by: Martijn van Dam (2017)
- Succeeded by: Hans Vijlbrief

Member of the House of Representatives
- Incumbent
- Assumed office 6 December 2023
- In office 23 March 2017 – 3 September 2021

Parliamentary leader in the House of Representatives
- In office 23 November 2023 – 23 February 2026
- Preceded by: Sophie Hermans
- Succeeded by: Ruben Brekelmans
- Parliamentary group: People's Party for Freedom and Democracy

Member of the Amsterdam Municipal Council
- In office 19 March 2014 – 23 March 2017

Personal details
- Born: 18 June 1977 (age 49) Ankara, Turkey
- Citizenship: Netherlands; Turkey
- Party: VVD (2009–present)
- Other political affiliations: SP (1999–2009)
- Spouse: René Zegerius (m. 2013)
- Education: Vrije Universiteit Amsterdam

Dilan Yeşilgöz-Zegerius (Note: In Dutch, the name Dilan Yeşilgöz-Zegerius is pronounced [ˈdilɑ ɲeːˈɕilɡʏs seːˈɣeːrijʏs]. In isolation, the names are pronounced [ˈdilɑn] and [jeːˈɕilɡʏs].) (née Yeşilgöz; born 18 June 1977) is a Dutch politician who has served as Deputy Prime Minister of the Netherlands and Minister of Defence since 2026. She has been Leader of the People's Party for Freedom and Democracy (VVD) since 2023. She also served as Minister of Justice and Security in the fourth Rutte cabinet from 10 January 2022 to 2 July 2024 and previously served as a member of the House of Representatives from 2017 to 2021 and as State Secretary for Economic Affairs and Climate Policy from 2021 until 2022.

== Early life ==
Yeşilgöz was born in Ankara, Turkey, on 18 June 1977 and migrated to the Netherlands as a child. Her mother is of Turkish origin and her father is Kurdish and originally from Tunceli, Turkey. Her mother, Fatma Özgümüş, is the director of the Netherlands Refugee Organization (VON). Her father, Yücel Yeşilgöz, is a criminologist and human rights activist. Yeşilgöz also has a sister who grew up with her and her mother and father.

Yeşilgöz's parents were active in the Turkish left and campaigned against the military regime of the National Security Council after it seized power in the 1980 Turkish coup d'état, calling for the restoration of democracy, individual liberties and human rights. Yücel Yeşilgöz fled Turkey and sought asylum in the Netherlands in 1981 after the regime persecuted him for his political activities. The rest of the family joined Yücel as refugees in 1984 when Dilan was aged 7, after they fled from Turkey through Greece and claimed asylum in the Netherlands to join him there.

After receiving her secondary education at the Vallei College in Amersfoort between 1991 and 1997, Yeşilgöz studied social and cultural sciences at the Vrije Universiteit Amsterdam, where she obtained a master's degree in culture, organisation and management in 2003.

== Political career ==
=== Early activism ===
After fleeing to the Netherlands, Yeşilgöz and her family became involved in Dutch left-wing politics. She joined the Socialist Party in around 1999, where she later became a board member for the Amersfoort branch of the party. She also took up an internship at GroenLinks and started writing for the Labour Party magazine Lava, the official publication of the Young Socialists. During this period, she organised demonstrations against the asylum policy of the VVD under asylum minister Rita Verdonk, which she would later come to support as VVD leader in 2023.

In 2006, Yeşilgöz moved to the municipality of Amsterdam, where she worked as an advisor to GroenLinks alderwoman Marijke Vos. In 2009, she chose to leave the SP and join the VVD. In an interview from 2023, she said she was alienated from the left after left-wing activists and politicians treated her differently from other Dutch citizens because of her family background, viewing her as a "victim who should be saved" rather than an equal. At this time, she researched the policy platforms and manifestos of other Dutch political parties and came to the conclusion that the liberal values of the VVD most closely represented her beliefs and the political values promoted by her family in Turkey.

=== Elected career ===
From 2014 to 2017, Yeşilgöz held a seat in the municipal council of Amsterdam. She was placed fourth on the VVD list in the 2014 municipal election. As a councillor, Yeşilgöz focussed on tackling and criminalising verbal aggression towards LGBT people and street harassment against women. She worked on this in the city council for three years, but proposals were always rejected by a majority. When she left for the House of Representatives in 2017, then-mayor Eberhard van der Laan praised her tenacity. He called it his farewell gift to Yeşilgöz that there would be an integrated approach to street intimidation in Amsterdam, based on a proposal she had submitted with Marijke Shashavari of the CDA at the time. A majority of the city council approved this proposal. De Volkskrant characterised her tenacious nature as a "pit bull with empathy".

Yeşilgöz was elected to the House of Representatives in the 2017 general election as 19th on the VVD list and with 5,643 preference votes. She initially served as her party's spokesperson for justice and security, but her portfolio later included climate policy and energy policy. Yesilgöz was re-elected in 2021, as 5th on the VVD list and with 45,630 preference votes. On 25 May 2021, Yesilgöz was appointed State Secretary for Economic Affairs and Climate Policy in the demissionary third Rutte cabinet, serving alongside Mona Keijzer. On 10 January 2022, she was appointed Minister of Justice and Security in the fourth Rutte cabinet.

The cabinet collapsed over disagreements about immigration reform on 7 July 2023, triggering a November 2023 snap election. On 12 July – two days after Prime Minister Mark Rutte declared he would no longer lead the party – Yeşilgöz announced her candidacy to become the next leader of the VVD. The party board formally nominated her for the position the following day, and Yeşilgöz officially became party leader of the VVD on 14 August. The VVD came in third in the snap election with 24 seats. Yeşilgöz became the party's parliamentary leader, but the duties were performed by Sophie Hermans due to Yeşilgöz's continued role as minister. In June 2024, opposition parties filed a censure and a no-confidence motion, neither of which received a majority, against Yeşilgöz, because she had claimed, following the cabinet collapse, that successive family reunifications resulted in thousands of additional asylum seekers per year. The actual figure was later revealed to be in the tens per year.

The Schoof cabinet was sworn in on 2 July 2024, bringing an end to Yeşilgöz's term as minister. Following the collapse of the Schoof cabinet, Yeşilgöz would once again lead the VVD for the 2025 Dutch general election. In 2026, she was appointed as Deputy Prime Minister and Minister of Defense in the Jetten cabinet.

== Political positions ==
As minister of justice and security, Yesilgöz advocated for criminal justice reform and strict policies against terrorism and organised crime. She supported laws to protect journalists who had been threatened for their work and supports deporting extremist imams from the Schengen area. In 2019, Yesilgöz called for a ban on "single shots" and heavy flares within the F2 category of the fireworks policy in the European Union, a policy idea which was opposed by the rest of the VVD. She opposed a total ban on consumer fireworks as parliamentary leader in 2025, arguing that it would not address violence against first responders, as such incidents often involved heavy fireworks already prohibited by law. Yesilgöz also supported mandatory use of body cameras for police officers. Although from a refugee background, Yesilgöz has said she would pursue further controls on immigration if elected Prime Minister.

In 2019, Yesilgöz expressed her support for trying Dutch ISIS terrorists detained by Kurdish forces on the spot, rather than repatriating them to the Netherlands. This was in contrast to the coalition parties D66 and the Christian Union who argued they should face trial in the Netherlands.

In 2022, Yesilgöz delivered the annual Hendrik Jan Schoo lecture entitled "Doing What It Takes to Protect Our Democratic Rule of Law" in which she criticised "wokeism", far-right politicians, and conspiracy theorists, and argued that the Dutch constitutional state is under pressure from left-wing activism. Yesilgöz considers Frits Bolkestein as her main liberal role model.

In contrast to her predecessor Mark Rutte, Yesilgöz said she would not exclude Geert Wilders and the PVV from coalition talks ahead of the 2023 Dutch general election. Following November 2024 Amsterdam riots targeting supporters of the Israeli football club Maccabi Tel Aviv F.C., Yeşilgöz stated that religion should not influence public life. She said that organized or political religious movements can be a danger to society, giving Islamism as an example. She reiterated her support of reforms to the constitution's freedom of education. Ahead of the 2025 Spring Memorandum, Yeşilgöz presented a plan to boost the purchasing power of the middle class by lowering the energy tax and raising childcare benefits. For the longer term, she advocated scrapping benefits and tax credits, to ensure total income increases with hours worked. The VVD planned to couple social security to inflation rather than the minimum wage, and it proposed a bill requiring that future budgets provide greater purchasing power gains to workers compared to non-workers.

== Personal life ==
Yesilgöz married René Zegerius in 2013. She is an Ajax supporter and a country music fan.

Although she has dual nationality, she considers herself Dutch and not Turkish. On the television program College Tour, she stated in September 2023 that she had never had a Turkish passport and that she had only known for a year that she still had Turkish nationality. With this knowledge, she says she formally renounced her Turkish nationality, though it had not yet been granted by the Turkish government at the time of the interview.

== Electoral history ==
Electoral history of Dilan Yeşilgöz
Year	Body	Party	Pos.	Votes	Result		Ref.
Year	Body	Party	Pos.	Votes	Party seats	Individual	Ref.
2014	Amsterdam Municipal Council	People's Party for Freedom and Democracy	4	679	6	Won	
2017	House of Representatives	People's Party for Freedom and Democracy	19	5,643	33	Won	
2021	House of Representatives	People's Party for Freedom and Democracy	5	45,630	34	Won	
2023	House of Representatives	People's Party for Freedom and Democracy	1	1,356,883	24	Won	
2025	House of Representatives	People's Party for Freedom and Democracy	1	691,062	22	Won	

== Notes ==
Political offices
Preceded by Ferdinand Grapperhaus	Minister of Justice and Security; 2022–2024	Succeeded by David van Weel
Party political offices
Preceded by Mark Rutte	Leader of the People's Party for Freedom and Democracy; 2023–present	Incumbent
