= Ministry of Economic Affairs and Climate Policy =

Government ministry of the Netherlands

- Dutch: Ministerie van Economische Zaken en Klimaat
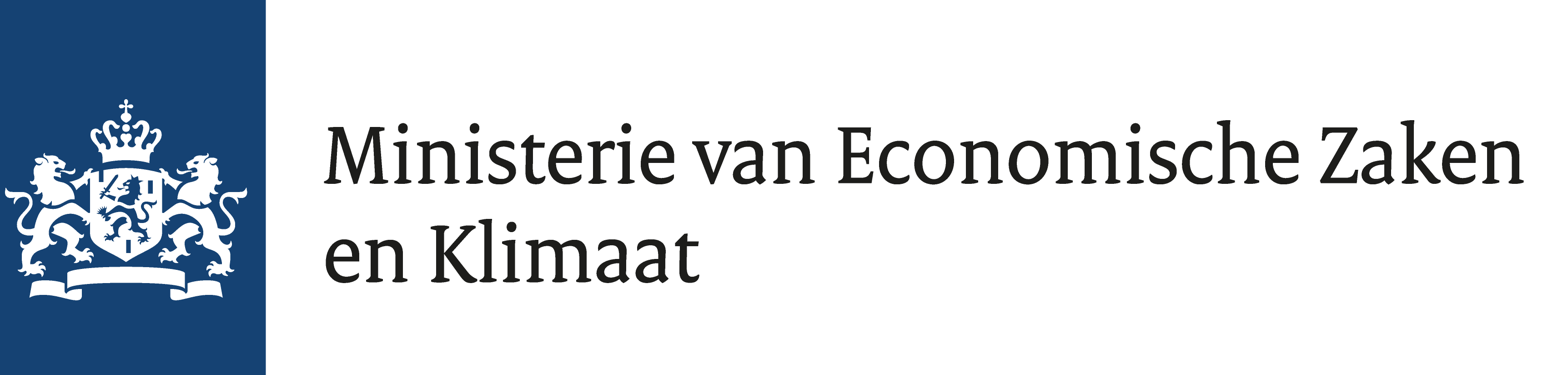
- Ministry logo

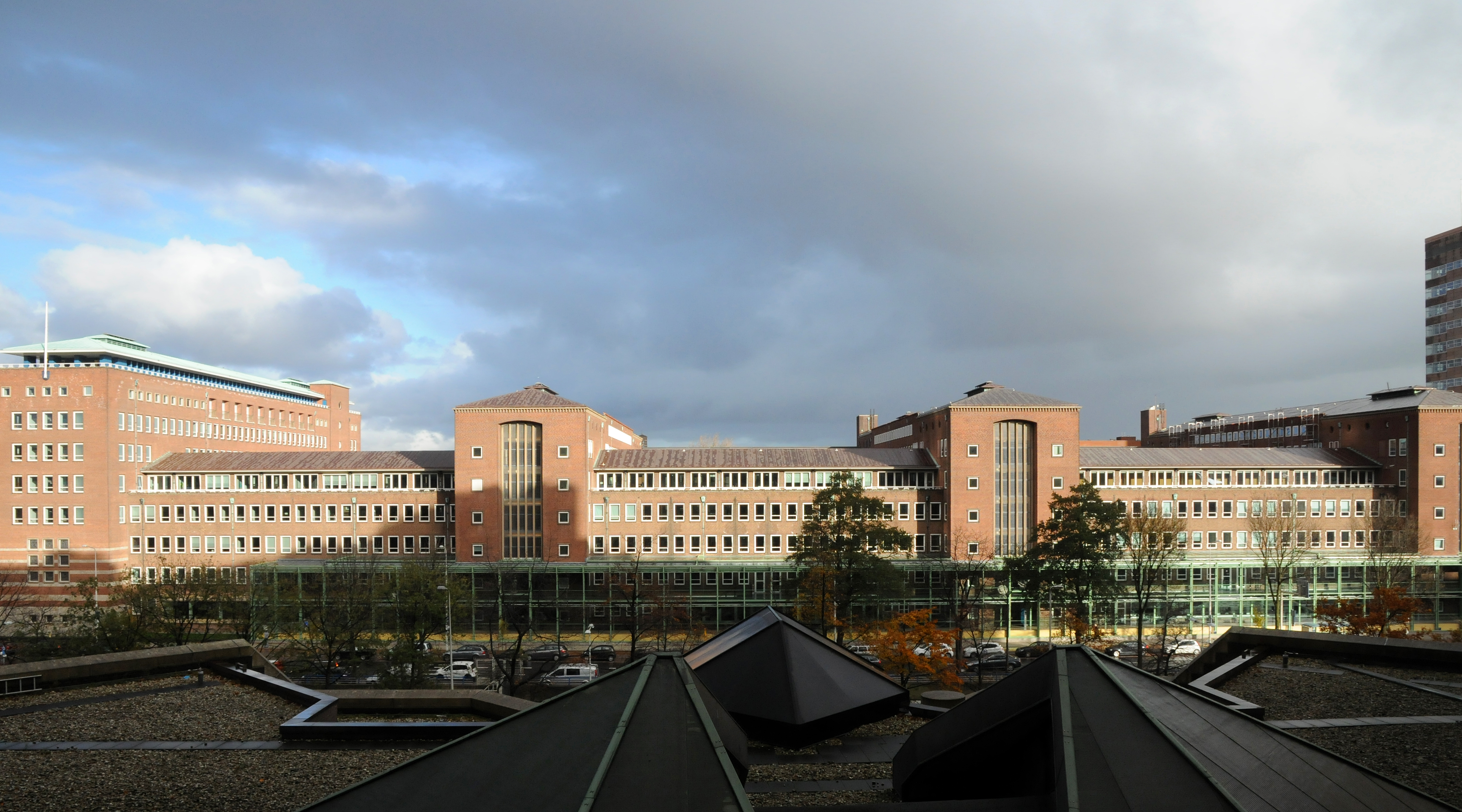
- Building of the Ministry of Economic Affairs and Climate Policy

Department overview
- Formed: 17 August 1905; 120 years ago
- Jurisdiction: Kingdom of the Netherlands
- Headquarters: Bezuidenhoutseweg 73, The Hague, Netherlands
- Annual budget: €5,2 billion (2018)
- Ministers responsible: Heleen Herbert, Minister of Economic Affairs and Climate Policy; Willemijn Aerdts, State Secretary for Digital Economy and Sovereignty; Stientje van Veldhoven, Minister of Climate Policy and Green Growth; Jo-Annes de Bat, State Secretary for Climate Policy and Green Growth
- Department executive: Sandor Gaastra, Secretary-General
- Website: Ministry of Economic Affairs and Climate Policy

The Ministry of Economic Affairs and Climate Policy (Dutch: Ministerie van Economische Zaken en Klimaat; EZK) is the Netherlands' ministry responsible for international trade, commercial, industrial, investment, technology, energy, nuclear, renewable energy, environmental, climate change, natural resource, mining, space policy, as well as tourism.

The ministry was created in 1905 as the Ministry of Agriculture, Industry and Commerce and has had several name changes before it became the Ministry of Economic Affairs in 1946. In 2010 the Ministry of Agriculture, Nature and Food Quality was merged with the Ministry of Economic Affairs, which was renamed as the Ministry of Economic Affairs, Agriculture and Innovation. In 2012 the name was reverted as the Ministry of Economic Affairs but kept the responsibilities of the former Ministry of Agriculture. In 2017, the Ministry of Agriculture, Nature and Food Quality was reinstated but the Ministry of Economic Affairs took on several of the environmental policies portfolios from the Ministry of Infrastructure and the Environment, which was renamed Ministry of Infrastructure and Water Management. The Ministry of Economic Affairs was renamed Ministry of Economic Affairs and Climate Policy. The old name was restored in 2024, when the Ministry of Climate Policy and Green Growth was spun off, but Climate Policy returned in 2026.

== Organisation ==
The Ministry currently has five Government Agencies and several Directorates:

| Government Agencies | | Responsibilities |
|---|---|---|
| Foreign Investment Agency (Dutch: Buitenlandse Investering Bureau) | BIB | International trade |
| Space Agency | NLSA | Space agency |
| Bureau for Economic Policy Analysis (Dutch: Centraal Planbureau) | CPB | Economic analysis |
| Central Agency for Statistics (Dutch: Centraal Bureau voor de Statistiek) | CBS | Statistical services |
| Patent Office (Dutch: Octrooicentrum Nederland) | OCN | Patent office |

== Mission ==
The mission of the ministry is to "promote sustainable economic growth in the Netherlands." It focuses on the key areas of "Knowledge economy and innovation," "Competition and dynamics" and "Room to do business."

== Organization ==
The political responsibility of the ministry is in the hands of the Minister of Economic Affairs and Climate Policy, who is part of the Dutch Cabinet. The state secretary, serves as the second-in-command to the minister.

The civil service department of the Ministry of Economic Affairs and Climate Policy is led by the secretary-general and the deputy secretary-general. The Ministry of Economic Affairs and Climate Policy consists of four directorates-general: Climate and Energy, Economy and Digitalisation, Enterprise and Innovation, and Realisation and Green Growth. The ministry also has some support departments.

== Litigation ==
In June 2015, following a lawsuit filed by the NGO Urgenda, the Hague District Court found that the ministry was unlawfully violating its duty of care under the European Convention on Human Rights by failing to adequately address climate change and ordered the government to reduce green house gas emissions. The government appealed to the Hague Court of Appeal, which ruled against the ministry in October 2018. The government appealed to the Supreme Court of the Netherlands, where, in December 2019, the decision was upheld under Articles two and eight of the ECHR.

== See also ==
- List of ministers of economic affairs of the Netherlands
