= Stientje van Veldhoven =

Dutch politician, diplomat and civil servant

Her Excellency Stientje van Veldhoven
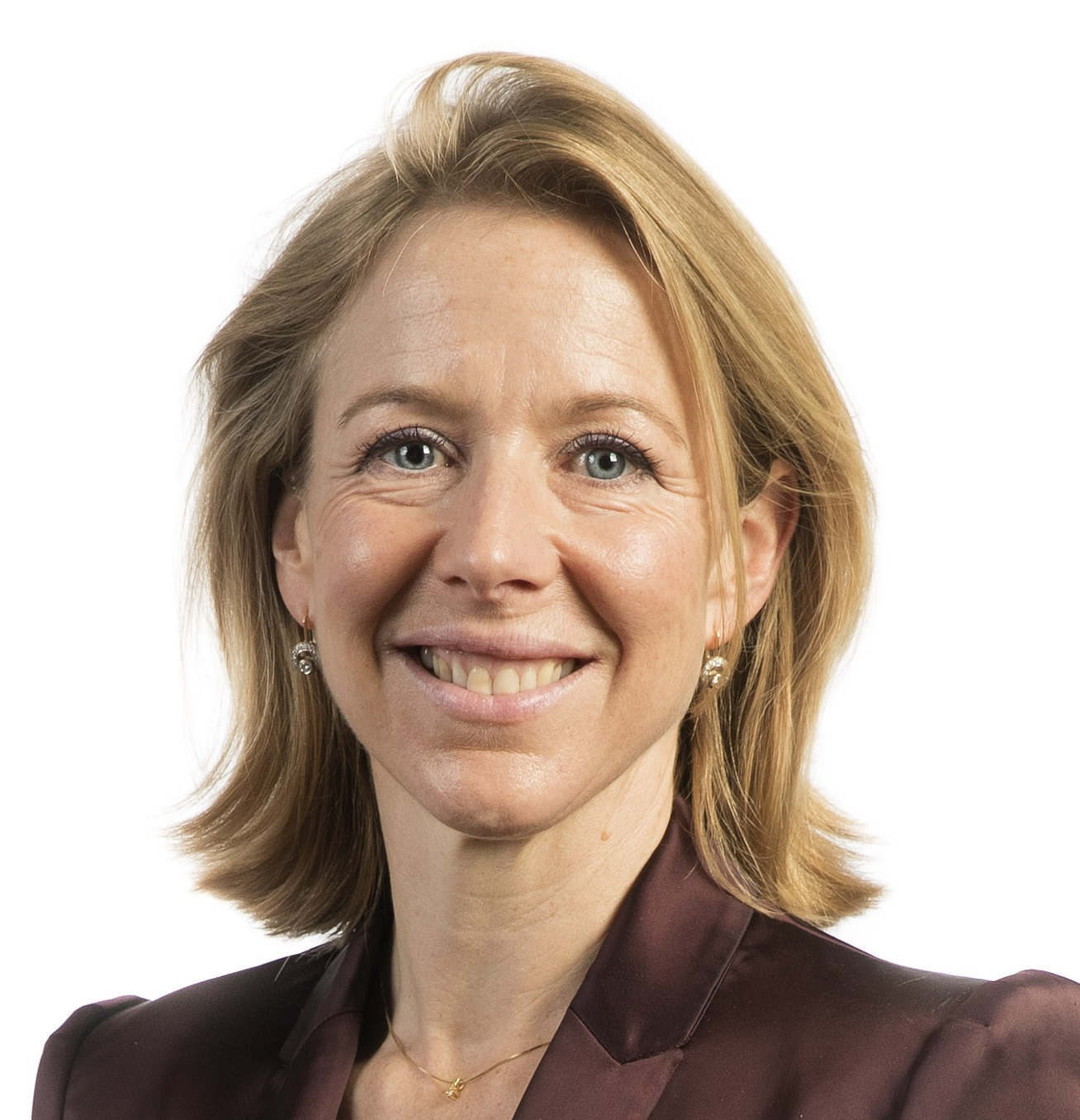
- Van Veldhoven in 2017

Minister for the Environment and Housing
- In office 1 November 2019 – c. July 2024
- Prime Minister: Mark Rutte
- Preceded by: Position established

State Secretary for Infrastructure and Water Management
- In office 26 October 2017 – 1 November 2019
- Prime Minister: Mark Rutte
- Preceded by: Sharon Dijksma
- Succeeded by: Position abolished

Member of the House of Representatives
- In office 17 June 2010 – 26 October 2017

Personal details
- Born: 22 June 1973 (age 53) Utrecht, Netherlands
- Party: Democrats 66
- Education: University of Groningen, University of Paris

Stientje van Veldhoven-van der Meer (born 22 June 1973) is a Dutch politician serving as Minister for the Environment and Housing in the Third Rutte cabinet since 2019. A member of the Democrats 66 (D66) party, she served as State Secretary for Infrastructure and Water Management from 2017 to 2019.

== Career ==
A diplomat and civil servant by occupation, Van Veldhoven studied policy and management in international organisations at the University of Groningen. She worked at the Ministry of Economic Affairs and Climate Policy and for the European Union in Brussels. She was elected political talent of the year 2012/2013 by the Dutch national radio and television broadcaster, Nederlandse Omroep Stichting (NOS).

She was elected to the House of Representatives from 17 June 2010 until her appointment as State Secretary for Infrastructure and Water Management. As a parliamentarian, she focused on matters of climate, energy, natural environment, agriculture, fishery, animal rights and development aid. In 2019, she was appointed minister without portfolio at the Ministry of the Interior and Kingdom Relations.

She announced her departure from politics as of July 19, 2021, to assume the role of Vice President/Director at the World Resources Institute Europe starting from September 1 of that year.

== Electoral history ==
Electoral history of Stientje van Veldhoven
| Year | Body | Party | Pos. | Votes | Result | | Ref. |
| Year | Body | Party | Pos. | Votes | Party seats | Individual | Ref. |
|---|---|---|---|---|---|---|---|
| 2021 | House of Representatives | Democrats 66 | 79 | 548 | 24 | Lost | |

Political offices
| Preceded by Sharon Dijksma | State Secretary for Infrastructure and Water Management; 2017–2019 | Succeeded by Position abolished |
| Preceded by Position established | Minister for the Environment and Housing; 2019–present | Incumbent |
