= Leiden Law School =

Faculty of Leiden University, The Netherlands

Coordinates: 52°09′22″N 04°29′23″E

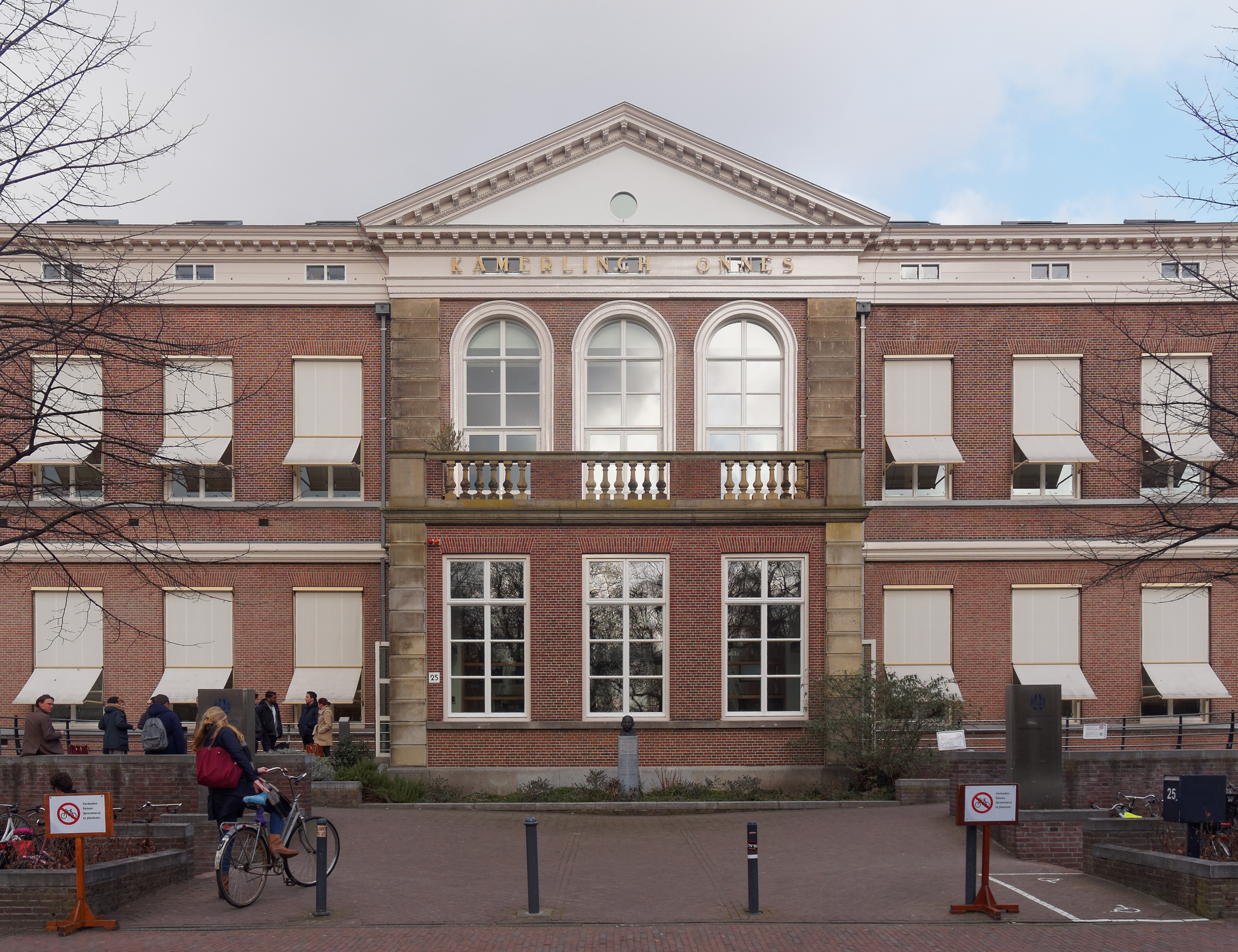
- Kamerlingh Onnes Building
- Motto: Libertatis Praesidium
- Motto in English: Bastion of Freedom
- Type: Law school
- Established: 1575
- Parent institution: Leiden University
- Dean: Suzan Stoter (interim)
- Faculty: 325
- Students: 5,473
- Location: Leiden, South Holland, Netherlands
- Website: universiteitleiden.nl/en/law/

Leiden Law School is the law school, and one of the seven faculties, of Leiden University. Teaching and research in the school take place across campuses in Leiden and The Hague in the Netherlands.

Instruction in law began with the university's founding in 1575. Alongside the disciplines of theology and medicine, it was considered a 'higher' faculty of great importance. It also established itself as the most international faculty due, originally, to the proportion of academics arriving from Germany in the mid-17th century. The law school has played a substantial role in wider Dutch society from its earliest years, being consulted in an official capacity on all manner of subjects from wills to piracy and privateering.

The school's present form has its roots in the 1980s when a reformation of the division of legal disciplines took place. Sacrifices were made in the 'meta-legal' disciplines, e.g. jurisprudence and sociology of law, to focus on 'positive law', particularly civil and international law which are considered traditional fields of strength of the law school. The faculty completed its move into the refurbished Kamerlingh Onnes Building in Leiden in 2004 where it is housed to this day.

Annually, the school has an intake of approximately 900 Bachelor's degree students and 1000 Master's and Advanced Master's degree students. Around 425 staff are employed in academic and administrative roles with approximately 325 in a teaching role. Approximately 18% of the academic staff are from outside the Netherlands. The majority of school activity takes place in Leiden, the minority based in The Hague is chiefly within the Grotius Centre for International Legal Studies on the Campus The Hague.

== History ==
=== Medieval and early modern faculty (1575–1799) ===
The medieval curriculum was based, whether one was studying law, medicine or theology, around Aristotelian thought. The doctrine of the 'golden mean', in which virtue is the mean between two extreme vices, was central to legal studies. The Hippocratic strands of Aristotelian thought were particularly influential in law, primarily his emphasis on common sense and the parallel between the 'natural equilibrium' of the physical body and aequitas, the Roman conception of justice manifested in the blindfolded goddess holding a set of scales.

The 16th century Leiden academic year contained 160 to 170 days for lectures with other time taken up by holidays, fairs and book auctions. There were no lectures on Wednesdays or Saturdays which were occupied by private classes, disputations and demonstrations by lecturers hoping to secure a post at the university. Generally, law was taught in the didactic tradition, professors were expected to profess from memory, not dictate, and students were expected to take notes. The conservative nature of teaching in the early law school is exemplified in the traditional nature of the faculty's treatment of Justinian's Institutions. As well as theoretical work law students would partake in disputations which involved practical application of law in situations such as contracts or wills.

It was during the late 16th and early 17th century that the faculty housed one of its most influential scholars, Hugo Grotius (or Hugo de Groot). In 1594, at age eleven Grotius was a student in the faculty and soon proved himself prodigious in liberal arts, sciences and law. Grotius went on to establish his own legal practice in The Hague and in 1607 was made Attorney General of Holland. His first great work: Mare Liberum (or the Freedom of the Seas), was published in 1609 and lay the foundation for the sea as international territory. The second of his magna opera: De jure belli ac pacis (On the Law of War and Peace), was published in 1625 and is also considered a foundational work of international law. It is remarkable for its explicit affirmation of the fact that the validity of the laws on war was not contingent on the existence of God, a departure for a scholar of natural law following de Vitoria and Suárez.

In the 25 years from its foundation in 1575 to 1599, the law school had an average of 27 new students registered per year. The enrollment steadily increased, from 1625–1649 average initial registrations were 116 which decreased slightly to 106 by 1675–1699. The 18th century saw a decline in the enrollment overall from 93 from 1700–1724 to 47 from 1750–1774. Comparing the first two centuries of the faculty's existence in terms of doctorate degrees awarded (which was the only type of degree awarded at that time), the proportion of law students being awarded the degree increased from 8% to 84% perhaps being explained by the purpose of study at Leiden shifting toward preparation for a specific profession rather than socialisation with a view toward taking a place in the Dutch or wider European cultural elite. Toward the end of the 18th century the university had built its reputation to be considered, according to Denis Diderot's Encyclopédie published in 1765, as "the leading university in Europe" (Note: 'L'académie de Leyde est la première de l'Europe. Il semble que tous les hommes célebres dans la république de lettres, s'y font rendus pour la faire fleurir, depuis son établissement jusqu'à nos jours.') with the teaching of law of a high standard.

=== 19th century ===
Turning to the early 19th century, the advent of the scientific method gave rise to a predominantly 'hybrid' method of teaching and research. This hybrid was characterised by a mixture of the new methods of science and the old Christian-derived ideas of harmony and reality as God-given. The first half of the century saw great scholars at Leiden in the burgeoning fields of natural history, physics and medicine. This was less so in law, with the exception of Joan Melchior Kemper who taught in the natural law tradition relying on philology. In terms of enrolment, law remained the largest faculty at Leiden; from 1775–1812, 1,270 students enrolled in law, the next largest being medicine at 953.

The 1815 Education Act made it compulsory for all students intending to study law to take a 'general foundation' course in humanities, the act also added the choice of a bachelor's degree to the existing doctorate. By 1876 the foundation course established in the Education Act was abolished for prospective law students. The bachelor's degree required courses on jurisprudence, Roman law and principles of the political economy. The doctorate required courses on Dutch civil law and civil procedure, commercial law, criminal law and procedure and Dutch constitutional law. From 1815–1845, 7% of law students were awarded doctorates while from 1876–1905 this increased to 75%. This was due to the lowering of academic demands in law; while medical students had to produce dissertation representing years of research, law students merely had to write a few pages of propositions or a compilation. This discrepancy led to the doctors of law being ridiculed as 'donkeys' by those more rigorously tested in the university.

By the mid-19th century, certain scholars were starting to question the importance of analogy and the status quo, choosing instead to idealise development and progress. In the law faculty, the liberal professor and future reviser of the Constitution of the Netherlands, Johan Rudolph Thorbecke personified this attitudinal shift. Following in Thorbecke's constitutionalist footsteps at Leiden were, notably, Johannes Theodoor Buys, Joël Emanuel Goudsmit and Simon Vissering. Later in the 1870s opposition reformed against positivism around new treatments of classical notions, such as justice, through academics including Hendrik Lodewijk Drucker, Willem van der Vlugt and Tobias Asser. Other notable faculty members of this period were Anthony Modderman and Henri van der Hoeven, the law school of the late 19th century had a considerable range of great scholars. During this time the law faculty dominated the university in terms of student numbers and it was not until after the 1876 Education Act that medical numbers increased steeply and overtook law.

=== 20th century ===
Moving into the 20th century, there was a division in the academic study of law between those pursuing a scientific, descriptive, positivist version of law and those seeking a normative and prescriptive version. Following the First World War, the faculty had maintained its strength in scholarship, names such as Cornelis van Vollenhoven in the field of Adat law in the Dutch East Indies, Hugo Krabbe with his contribution to the idea of pluralistic sovereignty, Eduard Meijers in legal history, and Willem Jan Mari van Eysinga in international law. It was after 1925 that student numbers sharply increased across the entire university (doubling from 1925–1960) with law only steadily increasing to around 1,000 in 1960.

In the wake of the German invasion and occupation of May 1940 the law faculty continued to teach and research for several months. This started to change on October 23 when a declaration requiring the dismissal of 'non-Aryan' staff was made. A planned senate meeting on the subject, prompted by Professor of International Law, Benjamin Marius Telders, was prevented by the Germans. However, smaller groups of Leiden faculty members met subsequently and lodged individual objections to the policy. On November 23, two 'non-Aryan' law professors were dismissed including Eduard Meijers, later father of the Burgerlijk Wetboek (Dutch Civil Code). On November 26, Professor Rudolph Cleveringa, the dean of the law school and former graduate student of Professor Meijers, gave a speech of dissent in which he read out the Meijers' letter of dismissal 'in all its stark grossness'. Cleveringa did not note the ideological underpinnings of the dismissal choosing instead to speak of the greatness of his mentor with the intention of preventing any reckless actions by his students. On November 27, the university was closed by the occupying Germans. Professor Telders was arrested and expelled to a concentration camp, he would die in Bergen-Belsen in April 1945. Professor Meijers was also sent to a concentration camp but survived the war. Professor Cleveringa was imprisoned at Scheveningen and later joined the Dutch resistance, also surviving the war. Further dismissals ensued during the war and the faculty, as part of the university, was refashioned to be more sympathetic to the Germans. Notably, Professor Roelof Kranenburg was arrested in March 1942 because his book on administrative law ignored imperatives of the occupying government.

In the post-war period, the faculty recovered from its wartime occupation with names such as Meijers and Cleveringa returning. Julius Christiaan van Oven, Frederik Mari van Asbeck, Jan Volkert Rijpperda Wierdsma, Jan Drion and Robert Feenstra consolidated the faculty's reputation, each held in high regard in their own fields. Turning to the legal curriculum, the image of law students as 'donkeys' resulting from their light academic requirements led to change in the Education Act of 1960 in which different specialisms were defined within law. The new 'master's degree' could be taken in Dutch law, notarial law or constitutional law. The university commissioned the building or conversion of many buildings with Leiden itself and recently in The Hague. The Gravensteen building was converted into a legal study area in 1955 and the Grotius Centre for International Legal Studies found a home in the former laboratories in the Vreewijk area of Leiden, as part of Campus The Hague.

=== 21st century ===
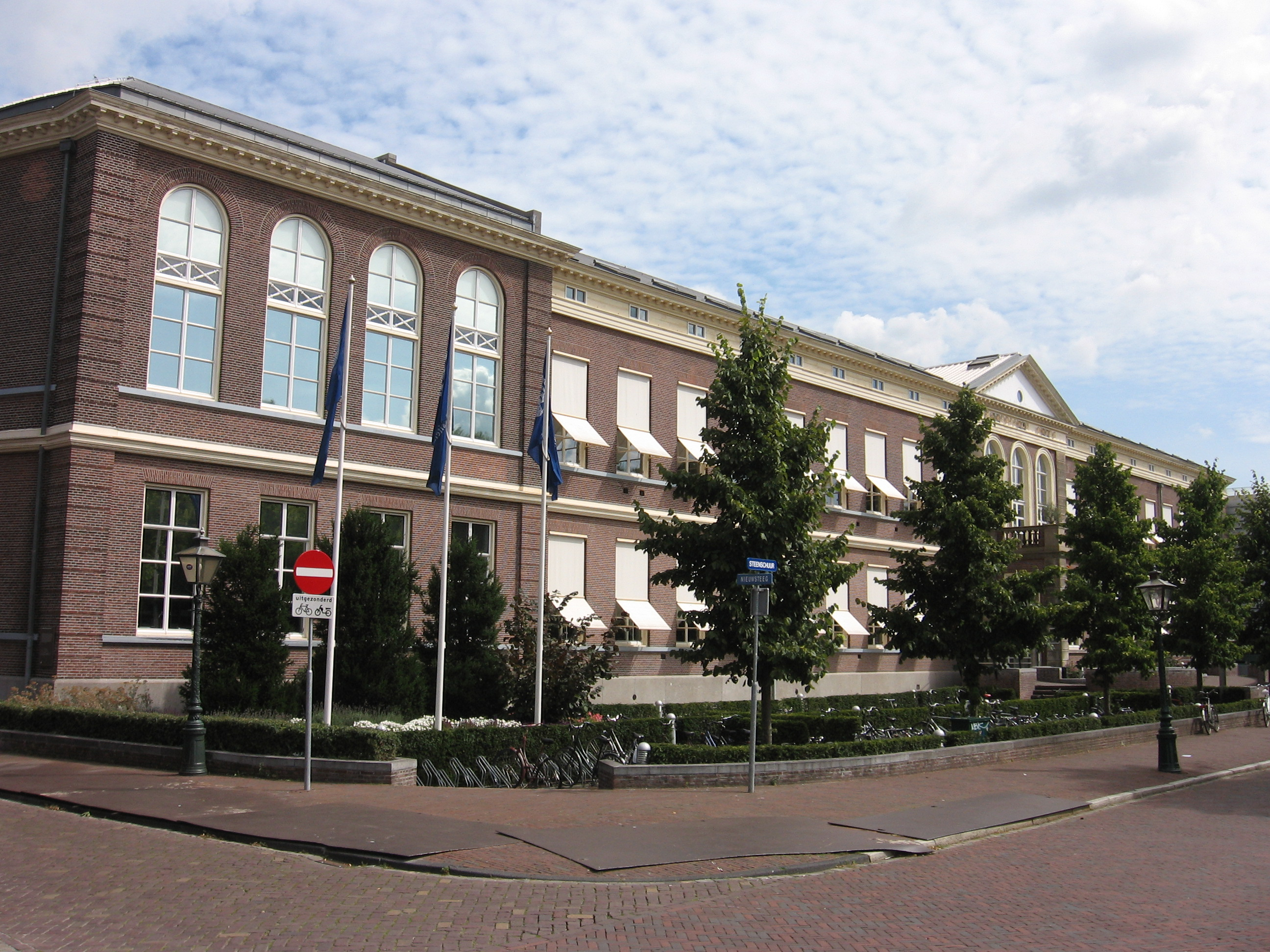
Kamerlingh Onnes Building, the Law School's home since 2004

In 1927, van Vollenhoven conceived the idea of extending the university campus around the Rapenburg Canal, this involved the purchase as well as the conversion of old buildings. As a result of this policy, the old Kamerlingh Onnes Laboratory, named after physicist Heike Kamerlingh Onnes, was restyled into a new home for the law school; the move was completed in 2004. A reorganisation of the faculty, which began in the 1980s, realigned the faculty's focus to major fields such as civil, corporate, notarial, criminal, European and international law; these areas remain Leiden's traditional areas of scholarly strength. The Cleveringa Institute was established in 2001 to maintain the integrity of teaching and intellectual rigour in courses. The faculty's research was moved to the E.M. Meijers Institute in 1997 and emphasised interdisciplinary scholarship as opposed to the classification of research by department. In response to growing internationalisation in the university research sector the law school jointly established the Strategic Alliance of Research Faculties of Law in 2003 with faculties at Bologna, Leuven, Oxford and Heidelberg.

== Structure ==
The faculty has five institutes; each institute is split into departments:

- Institute of Private Law
  - Department of Civil Law
  - Department of Child Law
  - Department of Notarial Law
  - Department of Company Law
  - Department of Financial Law
  - Department of Intellectual Property Law
  - Institute of Anglo-American Law
- Institute of Public Law
  - Europa Institute
  - Grotius Centre for International Legal Studies
  - International Institute of Air and Space Law
  - Department of Labour Law and Social Security
  - Department of Constitutional and Administrative Law
- Institute of Criminal Law and Criminology
  - Department of Criminal Law and Procedure
  - Department of Criminology
- Institute for the Interdisciplinary Study of the Law
  - Center for Law and Digital Technologies
  - Department of Jurisprudence
  - Department of Legal History
  - Moot Court and Advocacy
  - Department of the Philosophy of Law
  - Van Vollenhoven Institute for Law, Governance and Society
- Institute of Tax Law and Economics
  - Department of Economics
  - Department of Tax Law
  - Department of Business Studies

== Academic profile ==
University rankings

Global – Law
- QS Law: 24 (2024)
- THE Law: 17 (2024)

The law school is ranked within the top 25 law faculties in the world across the two major global rankings by subject (Times Higher Education and Quacquarelli Symonds). Nationally, the faculty is ranked first in the Netherlands in the Times and QS, both times followed in second place by the Faculty of Law of the University of Amsterdam.

== Notable people ==
=== Academia and literature ===
- Tobias Asser
- Jimly Asshiddiqie
- Rudolph Cleveringa
- Hendrik Constantijn Cras
- Petrus Cunaeus
- Anna Dolidze
- Henry Fielding
- Hugo Grotius
- Johannes Hevelius
- Christiaan Huygens
- Joan Melchior Kemper
- Roelof Kranenburg
- Eduard Meijers
- Henry G. Schermers
- Boudewijn Sirks
- Carel Stolker
- Isaac Titsingh
- Paul F. van der Heijden
- Cornelis van Vollenhoven
- Philipp Reinhard Vitriarius
- Willem Witteveen
- Gerrit-Jan Zwenne

=== Business ===
- Volkert Doeksen
- Victor Muller
- Gerard Schouw
- Morris Tabaksblat

=== Diplomacy and politics ===
- Piet Aalberse
- Nebahat Albayrak
- Frits Bolkestein
- Ben Bot
- Laurens Jan Brinkhorst
- Ditmir Bushati
- John Stuart, 3rd Earl of Bute
- Janus Henricus Donker Curtius
- Charles Ruijs de Beerenbrouck
- Jaap de Hoop Scheffer
- Johan de Witt
- Johannes Hudde
- Constantijn Huygens Jr.
- Ivo Opstelten
- Phoa Liong Gie
- Ali Sastroamidjojo
- Rutger Jan Schimmelpenninck
- Jan Six
- Achmad Soebardjo
- Soenario
- Sutan Sjahrir
- Martinus Theunis Steyn
- Pieter Steyn
- Johan Rudolph Thorbecke
- Jan Kappeyne van de Coppello
- Adriaen van der Donck
- Lousewies van der Laan
- Max van der Stoel
- Gerrit Jan van Heuven Goedhart
- Gijsbert Karel van Hogendorp

=== Judiciary and law ===
- Alexander Boswell, Lord Auchinleck
- Ernst de Jonge
- John Lauder, Lord Fountainhall
- Pieter Kooijmans

=== Royalty ===
- Beatrix of the Netherlands
- Prince Constantijn of the Netherlands
- Prince Floris of Orange-Nassau, van Vollenhoven
- Juliana of the Netherlands
- Pieter van Vollenhoven

== Bibliography ==
- Otterspeer, Willem (2008). The Bastion of Liberty: Leiden University Today and Yesterday. Amsterdam University Press – Leiden University Press Academic Series. Translated by Jackson, Beverly. Leiden: Leiden University Press. p. 312. ISBN 978-90-8728-030-7.
- Diderot, Denis; Alembert, J.L.R.; Mouchon, P. (1765). Encyclopédie; ou Dictionnaire raisonné des sciences: des arts et des métiers. Encyclopédie; ou Dictionnaire raisonné des sciences: des arts et des métiers (in French). Briasson.
