= Sander Dekker =

Dutch politician (born 1975)

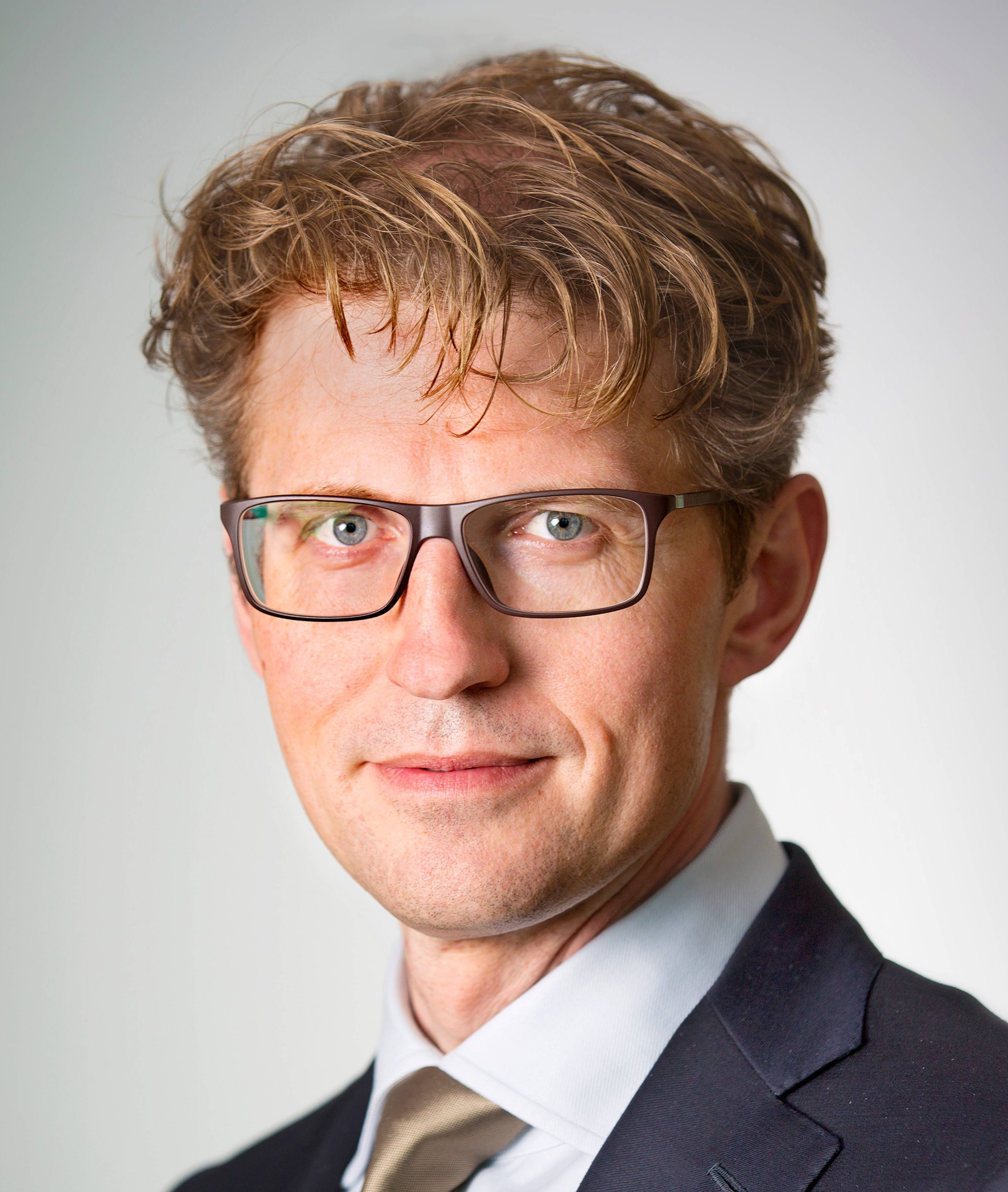
- Dekker in 2017

Minister for Legal Protection
- In office 26 October 2017 – 10 January 2022
- Prime Minister: Mark Rutte
- Preceded by: Office established
- Succeeded by: Franc Weerwind

State Secretary for Education, Culture and Science
- In office 5 November 2012 – 26 October 2017
- Prime Minister: Mark Rutte
- Preceded by: Halbe Zijlstra
- Succeeded by: Office abolished

Member of the House of Representatives
- In office 23 March 2017 – 26 October 2017

Personal details
- Born: 9 February 1975 (age 51) The Hague, Netherlands
- Party: People's Party for Freedom and Democracy
- Education: Leiden University (BPA, MPA)
- Occupation: Politician · Civil servant · Jurist · Researcher · Teacher

Sander Dekker (born 9 February 1975) is a Dutch politician who served as Minister for Legal Protection in the Third Rutte cabinet from 2017 to 2022. A member of the People's Party for Freedom and Democracy (VVD), he previously served as State Secretary for Education, Culture and Science under the Second Rutte cabinet from 2012 to 2017.

== Biography ==
=== Early life ===
Dekker was born in The Hague. He went to primary and secondary school in Zoetermeer. He studied public administration at Leiden University (1993–1999). After his studies, Dekker worked as a researcher and teacher at Leiden University, most notably on matters of police and justice. In 2001, he was a visiting researcher at the University of Oxford Centre for European Politics, Economics and Society.

=== Politics ===
Dekker served as State Secretary at the Ministry of Education, Culture and Science under the Second Rutte cabinet, dealing with higher education, science and knowledge, teachers and culture, between 5 November 2012 and 26 October 2017. He previously served as a municipal councillor in The Hague from 2003 to 2006, party group leader in the municipal council from 2004 to 2006 and an alderman in the municipal executive from 2006 to 2012. He was responsible for Education, Youth and Sports until 2010 and Finance from 2010 to 2012.

In July 2015, Dekker submitted to the States General a proposal to change two aspects of the freedom of education law:

1. Not to demand that new schools represent an ideological direction, such as a religion. New schools could be based on an idea for good education, for instance IT-based education, green schools, or other innovative concept, as long as sufficient interest exists for such a system.
2. To introduce more severe quality controls. Freedom of education should not be a license for bad educational systems.

On 26 October 2017, he was appointed Minister for Legal Protection, a ministership without portfolio at the Ministry of Justice and Security, in charge of Privacy Policy, Youth Justice, Copyright Law and Prevention, under Minister Ferdinand Grapperhaus. On 10 January 2022, he was succeeded by Franc Weerwind.

== Personal life ==
Dekker was injured in a bicycle accident in June 2022 that resulted in a three–day coma, a concussion, and fractures to his ribs, clavicle, and pelvis. He fell from his race bike after colliding with the arm of a woman who was gesturing disapprovingly at his speed. According to Dekker's wife, the woman had grabbed his arm, leading to her prosecution for assault. In June 2024, she was acquitted of the charges.

Political offices
Preceded by Halbe Zijlstra	State Secretary for Education, Culture and Sciences; 2012–2017	Office abolished
New office	Minister for Legal Protection; 2017–2022	Succeeded by Franc Weerwind
