= Joris Demmink =

Dutch civil servant

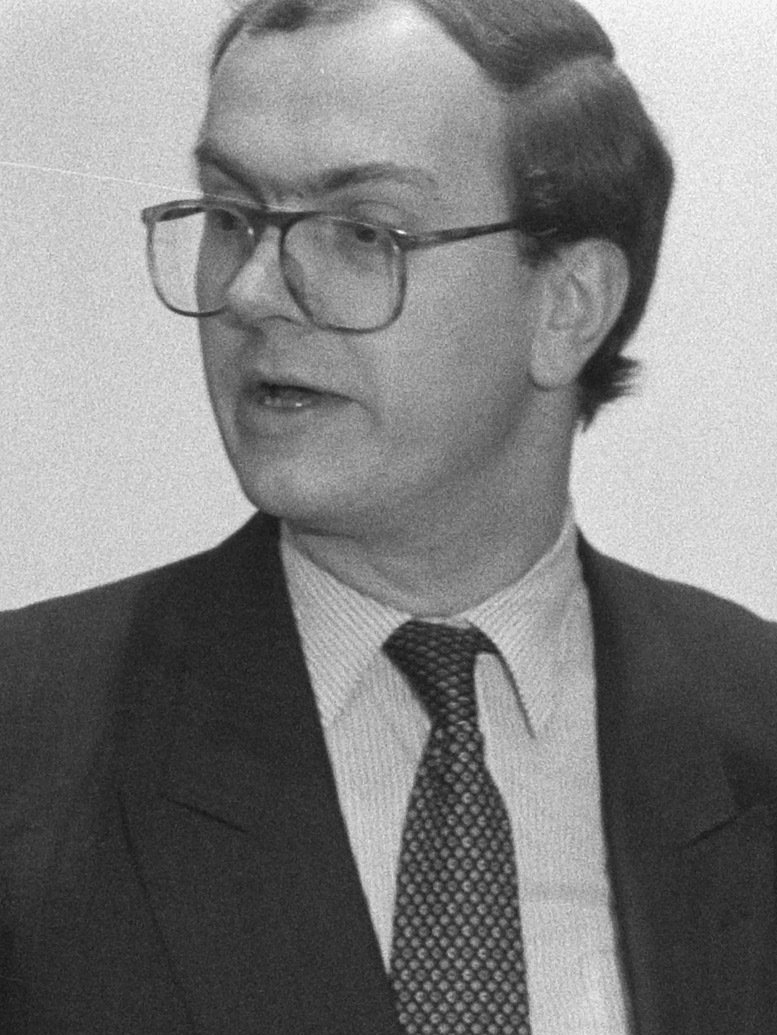
- Joris Demmink (1986)
- Born: December 11, 1947 (age 78); Laren, North Holland, Netherlands
- Occupations: Lawyer, civil servant
- Known for: Secretary-General of the Dutch Ministry of Justice (2002–2012)
- Political party: People's Party for Freedom and Democracy (VVD)

Joris Demmink (born December 11, 1947 in Laren, North Holland) is a Dutch lawyer and former senior civil servant. He was Secretary-General (Secretaris-Generaal) of the Dutch Ministry of Justice for ten years, from 2002 until his retirement at the end of 2012. In the 2010s, Demmink made headlines in the Dutch press after being repeatedly accused of sexual abuse of minors. However, despite several investigations, these allegations did not lead to a criminal conviction.

== Early life ==
Demmink was born in Laren (province of North Holland) in 1947. After graduating from high school, he studied law at the University of Leiden from 1966. During his studies, he joined the renowned student fraternity LSV Minerva, which included many Dutch elites among its members. Little is known about Demmink's family background; he was primarily known for his career in public service. Demmink is a member of the liberal-conservative party VVD, but did not hold any prominent political positions as a civil servant.

== Career ==
After completing his studies, Demmink began his career in the Dutch Ministry of Defense in the early 1970s. In 1982, he moved to the Ministry of Justice, where he quickly rose to senior positions. Among other things, he headed the Police Department and later the Main Department of Justice (Rechtspleging). From 1993 to 2002, Demmink served as Director-General for International Affairs and Foreigners (Directeur-Generaal Internationale Aangelegenheden en Vreemdelingenzaken). On November 1, 2002, he was appointed Secretary General of the Ministry of Justice, becoming the highest-ranking civil servant in that ministry. In this capacity, he served under several ministers of justice and remained in office until his retirement on November 1, 2012. He was awarded several high royal orders for his many years of public service.

== Allegations of sexual abuse ==
Rumors and allegations that Joris Demmink might be involved in cases of sexual abuse of minors have been circulating since the late 1990s. Specific allegations became public in the 2000s: Witnesses told the newspaper Algemeen Dagblad (AD) that Demmink had been in contact with a pimp of underage boys in the 1980s. In October 2012, the AD published an article on the subject based on statements from three witnesses; another informant claimed that boys had been taken away in Demmink's car. Demmink vehemently denied these allegations and sued the newspaper. However, he lost the case in court at the end of 2014, meaning that the report was not considered defamatory.

Another strand of allegations concerned alleged abuse during business trips in the 1990s. In 2007, an imprisoned Turkish man accused the then Secretary-General for Justice of raping two boys aged 12 and 14 in Turkey in the late 1990s. In 2010, Dutch lawyer Adèle van der Plas filed a criminal complaint against Demmink on behalf of one of the alleged victims. The Dutch public prosecutor's office initially saw no sufficient evidence and did not launch an investigation for years. It was not until January 2014 that an appeals court ordered a criminal investigation against Demmink on the basis of the rape allegations in response to a so-called Article 12 complaint.

Subsequently, a special team investigated the allegations from Turkey over several years. Demmink's travel documents, appointment calendars, financial transactions, and other documents from the period in question were thoroughly examined. Demmink himself stated that he had not been to Turkey since 1986. The investigators were unable to find any evidence that Demmink was in Turkey at the time the alleged crimes were committed. In addition, the Turkish judicial authorities refused to cooperate and rejected several Dutch requests for legal assistance. This made it difficult to prove the case. In June 2016, the public prosecutor's office announced that the criminal investigation had not produced any reliable evidence of Demmink's involvement in sexual offenses. The investigations were therefore discontinued in 2017.

Parallel to the Turkey allegations, another judicial investigation in the Netherlands caused a stir. Former underage prostitute Bart van Well initiated civil proceedings in which he accused the state of neglecting to protect children in prostitution. In this context, Demmink had to face questions about the abuse allegations in person for the first time in court in June 2016. He was questioned as a witness during evidence hearings and denied all allegations of ever having had sexual contact with minors or visiting places of child prostitution. During the hearing, however, Demmink admitted to having had a relationship with Hungarian porn actor Libor Čtvrlík in the past – something he had previously denied publicly. A total of nine witnesses were heard in this preliminary investigation to uncover a possible far-reaching network of child abuse in the 1980s.

=== Possible connections between Demmink and a larger network ===
The Demmink affair gained particular notoriety due to alleged connections between Demmink and the highest echelons of society. During witness hearings in 2016, several prominent figures were named who were allegedly involved in the abuse scandal or at least had knowledge of it. A witness testified under oath that he had been sexually abused as a teenager in an Amsterdam apartment and that the former mayor of Amsterdam, Ed van Thijn, the former finance minister, Onno Ruding, and Prince Claus (husband of Queen Beatrix) were among those present. The witness testified that he had been forced to sexually satisfy Ruding and had seen Claus in a bar “with boys.” These serious allegations against members of the political elite and even a member of the royal family caused a considerable stir.

However, some of the details provided during witness interviews proved questionable upon review. For example, the witness in question stated that the acts had taken place in 1982 in the apartment of a professor who had since died, but it turned out that the building in question had not been built until 1995. Such contradictions cast doubt on the credibility of individual statements. Nevertheless, the hearings revealed evidence that juvenile prostitution was widely tolerated in Amsterdam in the 1980s and that there was a circle of influential clients. A former employee of the municipal health service, Raphael Beth, testified that in the 1980s, an estimated 350 underage boys worked as prostitutes in Amsterdam – far more than officially assumed – and that “child prostitution was simply tolerated at the time.” According to informants, the clients also included high-ranking judicial officials and prosecutors, which led to covert investigations even back then.

In fact, Joris Demmink had already come under scrutiny in the late 1990s as part of the secret “Rolodex” investigation. This police investigation project aimed to uncover an alleged pedophile network in the highest circles, including the Ministry of Justice and the public prosecutor's office. However, according to two former criminal investigators, the investigation was abruptly halted when Demmink's name emerged as a possible suspect. On the orders of senior superiors, the ongoing investigations were halted in the middle of the trial, a move that the police officers involved described as unprecedented. One of the witnesses who claimed to have been raped by Demmink at the age of 14 received death threats after the case was dropped and had to go into hiding. According to statements made by police officers, Fred Teeven, who later became Minister of Justice, was aware of the suspicions against Demmink and was present when the ongoing investigation was closed. Teven had previously stated that he knew nothing about the allegations against Demmink.
