= Gerrit-Jan Zwenne =

Dutch legal scholar and lawyer

- Born: 1966 (age 59–60)

Academic background
- Education: Leiden University (law; PhD, 1998)
- Thesis: Belastingheffing en informatieverplichtingen (1998)

Academic work
- Discipline: Law
- Sub-discipline: Privacy and data protection law
- Institutions: Leiden University; Open University of the Netherlands

Gerrit-Jan Zwenne (born 1966) is a Dutch legal scholar and lawyer who specialises in privacy and data protection law. He has been professor of Law and the Information Society at Leiden University since 2011, and since 2023 he has also held a part-time chair in data protection in Dutch legal practice at the Open University of the Netherlands. He practises as a lawyer at Pels Rijcken in The Hague.

Zwenne's views on data protection have been cited in the Dutch House of Representatives by members of three parties, and the government and the Council of State referred to his articles in the legislative process for the Data Protection Omnibus Act. He wrote a scientific factsheet on data protection law for the House's Digital Affairs committee, and chaired the advisory committee of the government-commissioned evaluation of the Dutch GDPR Implementation Act. His commentary on the General Data Protection Regulation in the Dutch Tekst & Commentaar series has been cited in opinions of advocates general at the Supreme Court of the Netherlands.

== Education ==
Zwenne studied law at Leiden University. He received his PhD from Leiden in 1998 for a thesis on the scope and limits of the powers of the Dutch tax authority to obtain information from banks.

== Career ==
=== Academic career ===
Zwenne joined Leiden's department of law and computer science in October 1992. The department later became eLaw, the law faculty's centre for law and digital technologies, where he worked as an associate professor. On 1 October 2011 he was appointed professor of Law and the Information Society. He gave his inaugural lecture, De verwaterde privacywet ("The watered-down privacy act"), in April 2013. In it he argued that the concept of personal data had been stretched so far that the law was becoming hard to apply and enforce, which in turn weakened privacy protection.

From 1 June 2023 the Open University of the Netherlands appointed him for five years, one day a week, as professor of data protection in Dutch legal practice. He teaches there and helps develop new courses for its master's programme in data protection and privacy law.

=== Legal practice ===
Zwenne was sworn in as a lawyer in November 1998. He began as a trainee at the Hague firm Buruma Maris, which later merged into Houthoff, working on telecommunications law. In 2001 he moved with a large part of that telecoms practice to Bird & Bird, which opened an office in The Hague in November of that year. When he became a professor in 2011 he was a partner in the firm's telecoms and IT group. On 1 February 2016 he moved to the Amsterdam law firm Brinkhof as a partner. He joined Pels Rijcken, the firm of the landsadvocaat (the State's standing counsel), in 2018 and is now of counsel there. Chambers Europe has ranked him for nineteen years, twelve of them in its data protection category for the Netherlands; the 2026 edition places him in Band 1, the highest category.

Zwenne acts for both government bodies and companies. With his colleague Lars Groeneveld and the firm Lemstra Van der Korst, he represented the Data Privacy Stichting in its collective action against Facebook (now Meta) over the processing of Dutch users' personal data. He acted for the Dutch State in the collective action brought by the ICAM foundation over the data breach at the regional public health services (GGDs) during the COVID-19 pandemic. He was counsel for the Presidium and the Clerk of the House of Representatives in the GDPR proceedings brought against them by former Speaker Khadija Arib over access to, and the processing of, her personal data in the investigation into her conduct as Speaker. Before the Council of State he represented the Nederlandse Spoorwegen (NS) in two 2021 cases on the processing of passengers' personal data, including passengers travelling with an anonymous OV-chipkaart.

== Research and writing ==
In 2007 Zwenne and colleagues at eLaw wrote the first phase of the statutory evaluation of the Dutch Personal Data Protection Act (Wbp), a literature review of the act's aims and problems carried out for the Research and Documentation Centre (WODC) of the Ministry of Justice. Justice minister Ernst Hirsch Ballin sent the report to parliament in May 2007.

With Herke Kranenborg he edits Tekst & Commentaar Privacy- en gegevensbeschermingsrecht, an article-by-article commentary on the GDPR, the Dutch GDPR Implementation Act and related legislation; the ninth edition appeared in 2024 and the tenth in October 2026. Advocates general at the Supreme Court have cited his commentary on the GDPR in opinions on the right of access (2018 and 2024) and on credit registration (2021). He is one of the editors of Concise European Data Protection, E-Commerce and IT Law (third edition, 2018).

In 2016 he and A.H.J. Schmidt wrote one of the preliminary reports for the annual meeting of the Netherlands Lawyers' Association (NJV), on whether administrative law protects the homo digitalis, the citizen facing a digitising government. A year later he co-wrote, with Wilfred Steenbruggen, a report for the Dutch Health Law Association on the privacy risks of using big data to detect healthcare fraud. He is a co-author of a 2024 paper that proposed a definition and scope for police use of genetic genealogy databases.

== Parliament and policy ==
On 1 June 2012 Zwenne was one of the experts heard by a working group of the House of Representatives preparing its inquiry into government ICT projects. He later sat on the external sounding board of the temporary committee that carried out the inquiry. In October 2012, during question time on a data breach at the Groene Hart hospital, CDA MP Hanke Bruins Slot cited his remark that the leak was only "the tip of the iceberg". In January 2014 two VVD MPs put written questions to the government asking for its response to his remarks that government drone flights were rarely announced in advance; Defence minister Jeanine Hennis-Plasschaert answered them.

He submitted position papers to House round-table meetings on the European Court of Justice ruling that invalidated the Safe Harbor arrangement (December 2015), on privacy between individual citizens (October 2017) and on the Data Protection Omnibus Act (December 2024). In 2021 he wrote a scientific factsheet on the legal aspects of personal data protection for the standing committee on Digital Affairs. The committee decided to publish it and to circulate it among committee staff, so that they could bring it to the attention of MPs.

Zwenne chaired the advisory committee of the WODC evaluation of the GDPR Implementation Act, the data breach notification duty and the fining powers of the Dutch Data Protection Authority, published in 2022. In its March 2022 advice on the Data Protection Omnibus Act the Council of State cited an article by Zwenne and G.J. van Vlijmen on applying the GDPR in insolvency proceedings. During the plenary debate on that bill on 15 April 2025, GroenLinks–PvdA MP Barbara Kathmann returned to a point he had made at a round-table meeting: that it is unclear whether the ban on processing biometric data in article 29 of the Implementation Act covers only identification or verification as well. In May 2025 State Secretary for Justice Teun Struycken, assessing amendments to the bill, cited an article by Zwenne and Irvette Tempelman arguing that the Data Protection Authority should consult stakeholders on its interpretation of the GDPR.

He is a member of the Information and Transparency Advisory Committee of the Ministry of Justice and Security; in 2024 he was reappointed, with retroactive effect, for the term from October 2023 to October 2027.

== Media commentary ==
Dutch news media regularly ask Zwenne to comment on privacy questions. In 2017, ahead of the GDPR taking effect, he told the bar journal Advocatenblad that the new rules would not come as a great shock to most companies, and that because of fast technological change it would take years of case law before their meaning became clear. The public broadcaster NOS interviewed him in 2020 about the security of Zoom, which Leiden University had already ruled out, and in 2026 about how long owners of video doorbells may keep footage. In 2025 he told Het Financieele Dagblad that the broad access of Bitvavo's management to customer data was at odds with privacy law. In October 2026 he spoke to NRC about a planned lawsuit by three organisations against Meta over its camera glasses.

== Other positions ==
Zwenne is a co-founder and the chair of the Association of Privacy Law Lawyers (VPR-A), a specialist association recognised by the Netherlands Bar. In 2019 he developed, with Juridisch PAO Leiden, the specialist course that lawyers must complete to become members. He sits on the board of the Dutch Privacy Law Association and chairs the supervisory board of the Dutch register of data protection officers. He is also a member of the advisory board of the Nationaal Archief, of the Netherlands Bar's advisory committee on the rule of law, and of the ethics sounding board of the Dutch National Police.

== Selected publications ==
- Zwenne, G.J. (1998). Belastingheffing en informatieverplichtingen (in Dutch). The Hague: Sdu Uitgevers. ISBN 90-5409-199-1. (PhD thesis)
- Zwenne, G.J.; Schmidt, A.H.J. (2016). "Wordt de homo digitalis bestuursrechtelijk beschermd?". Homo digitalis. Handelingen Nederlandse Juristen-Vereniging 2016-I (in Dutch). Deventer: Wolters Kluwer.
- Gijrath, Serge; van der Hof, Simone; Lodder, Arno R.; Zwenne, Gerrit-Jan, eds. (2018). Concise European Data Protection, E-Commerce and IT Law (3rd ed.). Kluwer Law International. ISBN 978-90-411-9407-7.
- Zwenne, G.J.; Kranenborg, H.R., eds. (2026). Tekst & Commentaar Privacy- en gegevensbeschermingsrecht (in Dutch) (10th ed.). Deventer: Wolters Kluwer. ISBN 978-90-13-18225-5.
- Tuazon, Oliver M.; Wickenheiser, Ray A.; Ansell, Ricky; Guerrini, Christi J.; Zwenne, Gerrit-Jan; Custers, Bart (2024). "Law enforcement use of genetic genealogy databases in criminal investigations: Nomenclature, definition and scope". Forensic Science International: Synergy. 8 100460. doi:10.1016/j.fsisyn.2024.100460.
