= LSV Minerva =

Dutch traditional student fraternity

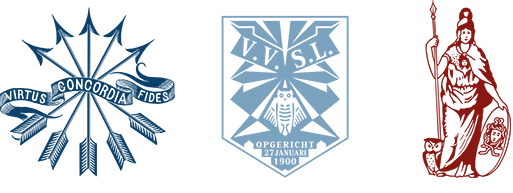
Coat of arms of the Leiden Student Corps, the Female Union for Students in Leiden, and the Minerva Association

The Leiden Student Association Minerva (Dutch: De Leidse Studenten Vereniging Minerva), also known as LSV Minerva or Minerva, is a traditional co-ed student fraternity in Leiden. The organization's motto is Virtus, Concordia, Fides (virtue, harmony, and loyalty). LSV Minerva is considered one of the most elite organizations in the Netherlands. Many influential people in the country have been a member of the student association, including many members of the Dutch royal family. In 2025, the association had just under 2,700 members.

== History ==
The Minerva Society, a student fraternity for graduates of the University of Leiden, was founded in 1814 as the first student fraternity in the Netherlands and was named after the Roman goddess Minerva. In 1846, the society moved into its current headquarters at Breestraat 50 in Leiden. Following a speech by university lecturer Rudolph Cleveringa against the exclusion of Jewish professors and a student strike, the Minerva Society was banned by the National Socialist occupiers in 1940 and its property was confiscated by the Germans. It was not until the end of the war in 1945 that it was revived, and the following year Winston Churchill visited the society and said “I see tremendous forces in this room.”

After a major fire on the night of December 2-3, 1959, the society's new clubhouse, built in a brutalist architectural style, was opened in 1965. The LSV Minerva in its current form was founded on January 1, 1974, and marked the merger of the Leiden Student Corps (which was male-only) with the VVSL (Female Union for Students in Leiden, founded in 1900). In 2014, the association celebrated its 200th anniversary.

== Structure ==
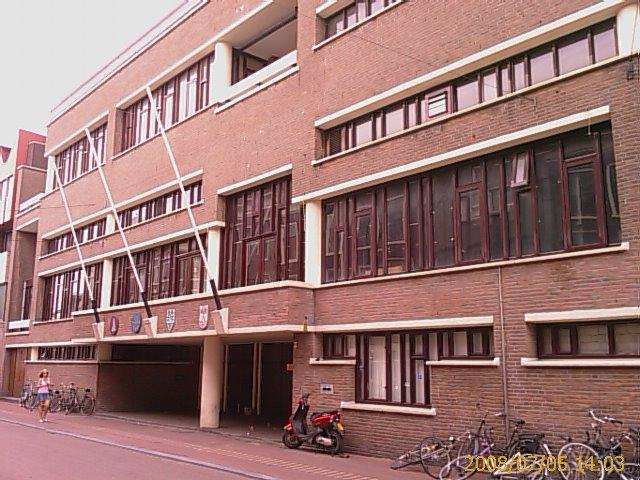
Main building in Breestraat 50 in Leiden

Since 1994, the board of Minerva (the Collegium Civitates Academicae Lugduno-Batavae Supremum) and the board of the Minerva Society (the Commission) have formed a single administrative body under the leadership of the Praeses Collegii (chairman).

Club life primarily takes place within the student body. Each academic year, new Minerva members establish several gender-segregated year clubs with an average of twenty women or men. The year group club forms the basis for the activities of the society and within Minerva. In addition to the horizontal structure of a year group club, Minerva also has a vertical structure, known as “associations.” These vertical structures comprise year group clubs from different years.

The association has several sub-associations that focus on a specific activity, sport, or topic, including the music group Sempre Crescendo, the student militia Pro Patria, and the rowing club Njord. During the Cold War and the student movement of the 1960s, controversy arose over the militaristic and nationalistic orientation of Pro Patria, even within the university, which is why there were even calls at times for the militia to be disbanded. Prince Bernhard was patron of Pro Patria for many years. After Prince Bernhard's death, the Inspector General of the Dutch Armed Forces became patron of Pro Patria. In addition to these sub-associations, there are several sports clubs (association football, hockey, rugby) affiliated with the organization.

== Members ==
- Jacob van Lennep (1802–1868), writer
- Robert Fruin (1823–1899), historian
- Conrad Busken Huet (1826–1886), writer
- William, Prince of Orange (1840–1879), Prince of the Netherlands
- Pieter Cort van der Linden (1846–1935), politician and Prime Minister of the Netherlands
- Alexander, Prince of Orange (1851–1884), Crown Prince of the Netherlands and Luxembourg
- Hendrik Antoon Lorentz (1853–1928), Nobel Prize winner for physics
- Pieter Helbert Damsté (1860–1943), classical philologist
- Adriaan Daniël Fokker (1887–1972), physicist and musician
- Rudolph Cleveringa (1894–1980), university professor
- Eelco van Kleffens (1894–1983), Minister of Foreign Affairs of the Netherlands
- Annie Romein-Verschoor (1895–1978), historian
- Jef Last (1898–1972), poet and writer
- Benjamin Marius Telders (1903–1945), lawyer and politician
- Juliana of the Netherlands (1909–2004), Queen of the Netherlands
- Hamengkubuwono IX (1912–1988), Sultan of Yogyakarta and Vice President of Indonesia
- Ernst de Jonge (1914–1944), rower and resistance fighter
- Bram van der Stok (1915–1993), fighter pilot
- George Maduro (1916–1945), resistance fighter
- Jérôme Heldring (1917–2013), journalist and editor-in-chief
- Erik Hazelhoff Roelfzema (1917–2007), writer and resistance fighter
- Molly Geertsema (1918–1991), lawyer, politician, and cabinet minister
- Max van der Stoel (1924–2011), politician and diplomat
- Jon van Rood (1926–2017), immunologist
- Gijs van Aardenne (1930–1995), politician and cabinet minister
- Rudolf de Korte (1936–2020), manager, politician, and cabinet minister
- Laurens Jan Brinkhorst (born 1937), politician, cabinet minister, and Member of the European Parliament
- Beatrix of the Netherlands (born 1938), Queen of the Netherlands
- Paul Verhoeven (born 1938), film director
- Pieter van Vollenhoven (born 1939), lawyer and professor, husband of Margriet of Orange-Nassau
- Herman Tjeenk Willink (born 1942), politician and cabinet minister
- Pieter Winsemius (born 1942), politician and cabinet minister
- Margriet of Orange-Nassau (born 1943), princess of the Netherlands
- Ivo Opstelten (born 1944), politician and Minister of Justice
- Jaap de Hoop Scheffer (born 1948), politician, Dutch Minister of Foreign Affairs and Secretary General of NATO
- Carel Struycken (born 1948), actor
- Alexander Rinnooy Kan (born 1949), mathematician and manager
- Charlene de Carvalho-Heineken (born 1954), entrepreneur
- Maxime Verhagen (born 1956), politician and cabinet minister
- Gijs de Vries (born 1956), politician and Member of the European Parliament
- Hans van Baalen (1960–2021), politician and Member of the European Parliament
- Astrid of Belgium (born 1962), Princess of Belgium
- Franc Weerwind (born 1964), politician and cabinet minister
- Willem-Alexander (born 1967), King of the Netherlands
- Constantijn of the Netherlands (born 1969), Prince of the Netherlands
- Ard van der Steur (born 1969), politician and cabinet minister
- Melanie Schultz van Haegen (born 1970), politician and cabinet minister
- Carolijn Brouwer (born 1973), sailor
- Wopke Hoekstra (born 1975), politician, cabinet minister, and EU Commissioner for Climate Action
- Jacobine Veenhoven (born 1984), rower
