= Teun Struycken =

Teun Struycken may refer to:

- Teun Struycken (born 1906) (1906–1977), Dutch jurist and politician of the Catholic People's Party
- Teun Struycken (born 1969), Dutch jurist and independent politician, grandson of the former
