= Members of the ECSC Parliament (1952–1958) =

European Coal and Steel Community parliament delegations

This is a breakdowns of the European Coal and Steel Community parliament delegations. This parliamentary session is from 1952 to 1958

- Members ECSC for Belgium 1952–1958
- Members ECSC for France 1952–1958
- Members ECSC for Italy 1952–1958
- Members ECSC for Luxembourg 1952–1958
- List of members of the European Coal and Steel Community Parliament for the Netherlands, 1952–1958
- Members ECSC for West-Germany 1952–1958
