= Eduard Meijers =

Dutch jurist (1880–1954)

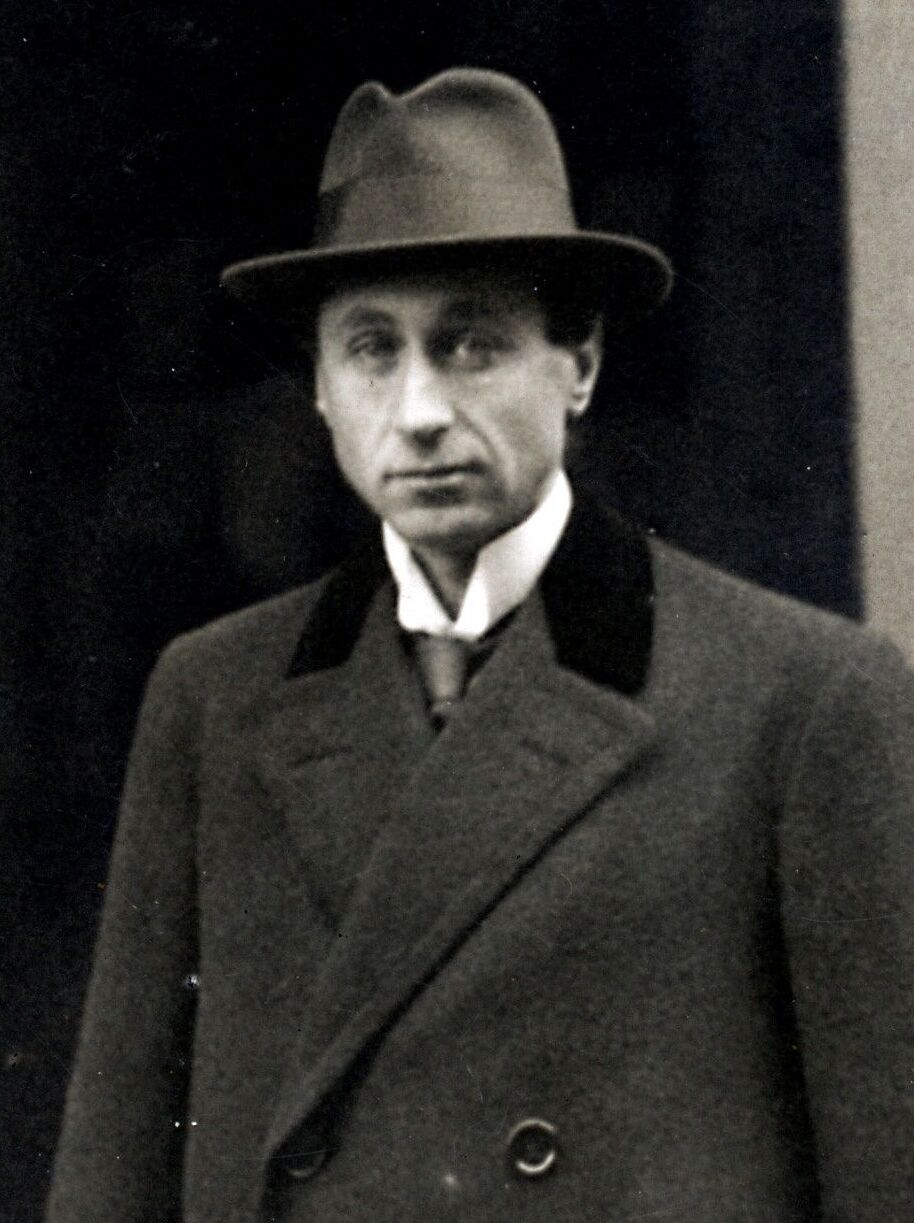
- Meijers in 1917
- Born: 10 January 1880; Den Helder, Netherlands
- Died: 25 June 1954 (aged 74); Leiden, Netherlands
- Known for: Developing the Dutch Civil Code
- Spouse: Tonij Gottschalk (m. 1909)
- Children: 4
- Relatives: Ivo Samkalden (son-in-law)

Academic background
- Education: University of Amsterdam
- Thesis: Dogmatische rechtswetenschap (1903)
- Doctoral advisor: Johannes Houwing

Academic work
- Discipline: Law
- Sub-discipline: Private law; private international law
- Institutions: Leiden University
- Doctoral students: Rudolph Cleveringa; Derk Spitzen; Arthur Diemer Kool; Pieter Godfried Maria van Meeuwen; Franz Lichtenauer; Johannes Christiaan de Wet; Pieter verLoren van Themaat

Eduard Maurits Meijers (10 January 1880 in Den Helder – 25 June 1954 in Leiden) was a Dutch jurist of Jewish background, who was the founding father of the current Dutch civil code, the Nieuw Burgerlijk Wetboek.

== Biography ==
=== Family ===
He was the son of Isidor Meijers, a Dutch Navy physician, and Julie Wolff. Eduard married Tonij Gottschalk on 12 August 1909. The couple had four daughters.

=== Career ===
In 1897, Meijers entered the University of Amsterdam to study law. He finished his doctorate under Johannes Houwing in April 1903. His dissertation had an emphasis on philosophy, defending utilitarianism against Kant's rationalism and posing that in general, well-being should be the final goal of every law institution.

After his studies, he ran a law practice in Amsterdam. In 1910, he accepted a chair in private law and private international law at Leiden University. He was particularly interested in legal history, and his publications were of great influence on the development of this field in the Netherlands. He became internationally recognised and received honorary degrees from the universities of Aberdeen, Brussels, Glasgow, Leuven, Lille and Paris. In 1920 Meijers became member of the Royal Netherlands Academy of Arts and Sciences. From 1918 to 1922 Meijers was dean of the law faculty in Leiden; in 1926 and 1927 he was rector of the university.

=== Second World War ===
The firing of Meijers and other Jewish scientists in 1940 by the German occupiers led Meijers' former graduate student Rudolph Cleveringa to give a widely acclaimed and consequential protest address on 26 November 1940. He was forced to resign from the Royal Netherlands Academy of Arts and Sciences in 1942, although he was re-admitted after the war in 1945. On 7 August 1942 Meijers, his wife and their youngest daughter were deported to the Westerbork transit camp, on to Camp Barneveld as part of Plan Frederiks, and back to Westerbork in September 1943. In September 1944 he was transported to the Theresienstadt concentration camp in Bohemia. He survived the camps and returned to Leiden on 25 June 1945.

=== A new Dutch civil code ===
On 25 April 1947 Meijers was tasked by royal decree with the drafting of a new civil code for the Netherlands (the Burgerlijk Wetboek) to replace the current code, which had been in place since 1838. In 1954, Meijers handed over the design for the first four books, accompanied with an extensive explanation. After Meijers' death that same year, his work was continued by Jan Drion, Jannes Eggens, Frits de Jong and Geert de Grooth. The first book of the new civil code was codified in 1970, the second in 1976. The last four of the seven books were codified only in 1992, 45 years after Meijers had started the work.

== Sources ==
- E.M. Meijers and the Recodification of the Dutch Civil Code after World War II"
- Leiden University biography
- de Jong, Lou (1978). Het Koninkrijk Der Nederlanden In De Tweede Wereldoorlog 1939-1945, Deel 8, Tweede helft (in Dutch). The Hague: Martinus Nijhoff. ISBN 902472077X.
