= Claudia van Bruggen =

Dutch politician (born 1980)

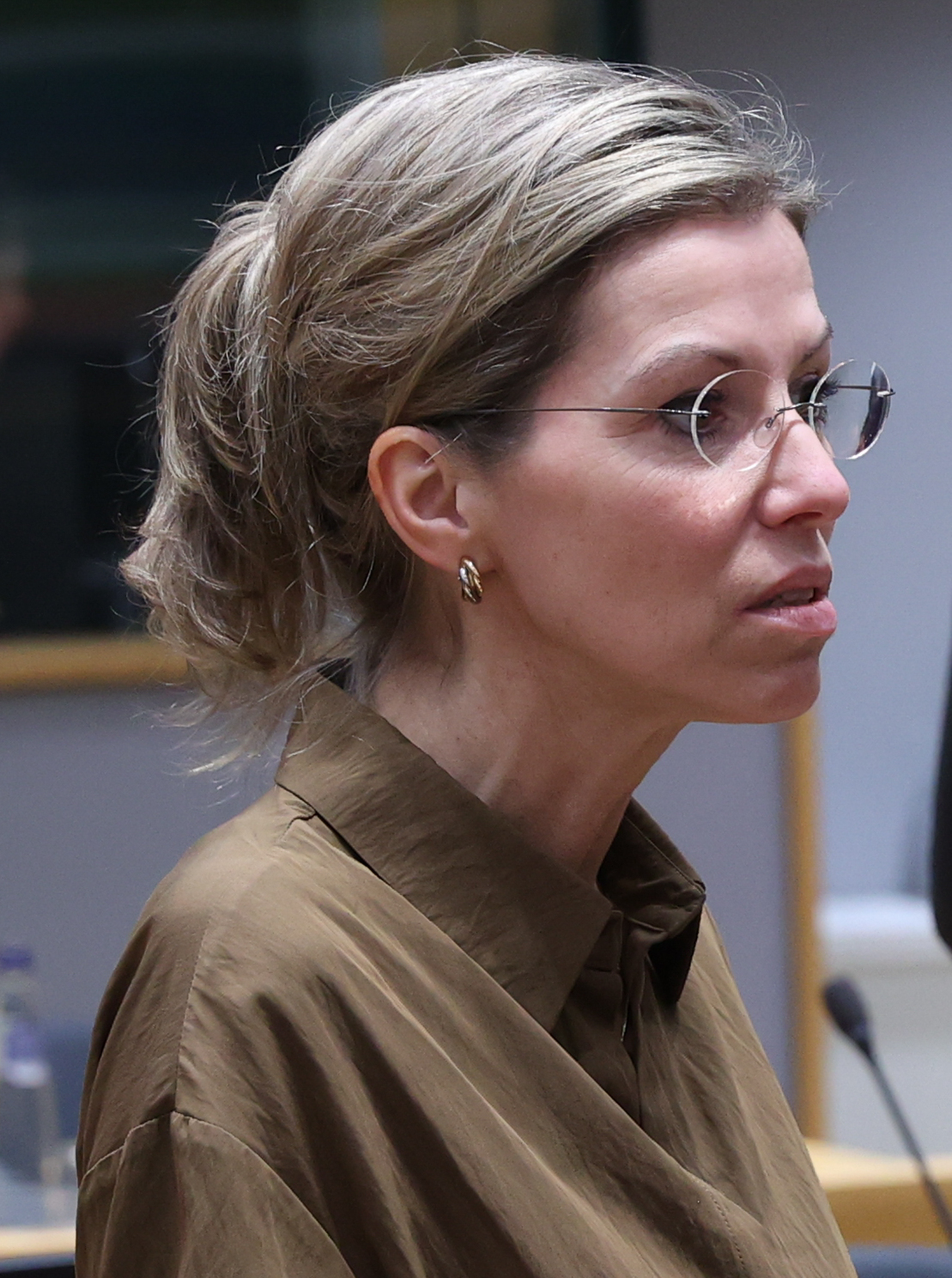
- Claudia van Bruggen (2026)

State Secretary for Legal Protection and Detention
- Incumbent
- Assumed office 23 February 2026
- Prime Minister: Rob Jetten
- Preceded by: Arno Rutte

Personal details
- Born: 21 April 1980 (age 46) Wezep, Netherlands
- Party: Democrats 66

Claudia van Bruggen (born 21 April 1980) is a Dutch politician of the Democrats 66 (D66) party. From 2014 to 2022 she was a member of the municipal council of Zwolle. Van Bruggen was installed as State Secretary for Legal Protection and Detention within the Ministry of Justice and Security in the Jetten cabinet on 23 February 2026.
