= Argos (radio program) =

Dutch investigative radio program

- Running time: 1hr (2:00 pm – 3:00 pm)Saturday
- Country of origin: Netherlands
- Language(s): Dutch
- Home station: VPRO
- Hosted by: Eric Arendt
- Original release: 1992

Argos is a Dutch radio show, broadcast on NPO Radio 1 on Saturday afternoon. The show first aired in October 1992. Argos tries to shed light on abuse of power and problems in society by means of research and to bring investigations to the attention of politicians by means of research. The show won the Zilveren Reissmicrofoon in 2017 after winning the Rooie Reus-Prijs already in 2012.

== Ritual abuse ==
In 2020, Argos released their one-year investigation 'Shards of glass and dark rituals' concerning Satanic ritual abuse. Six well-known people were mentioned as perpetrators by multiple participants in the investigation, and over ten abuse locations. A warehouse in the Bollenstreek was marked as a location for 'storage' and production of child pornography. Argos' journalists Sanne Terlingen, Huub Jaspers and Sophie blok received an anonymous email during this investigation stating the journalists had to 'be aware' because 'they know about your investigation', in which the anonymous sender mentioned ‘they’re going to get rid of evidence – just like they did with Dutroux’. The same day as the journalists received the e-mail, the warehouse in the Bollenstreek burnt down. According to Argos, the damage had been classified so severe by the fire department a cause of fire could not be determined.

As a response to parliamentary questions following, Dutch minister of Justice Ferdinand Grapperhaus said on 27 August 2020 there would be 'no independent investigation into Ritual Abuse' of children in The Netherlands. The Green Left, the Socialist Party and the Labour Party criticised the minister for his decision. On 13 October the House of Representatives approved a motion in which the PvdA, GL and the SP requested that an independent investigation be conducted into the nature and extent of "organized sadistic abuse of children", bypassing Grapperhaus' original refusal to investigate ritual abuse.
