= Franc Weerwind =

Dutch politician (born 1964)

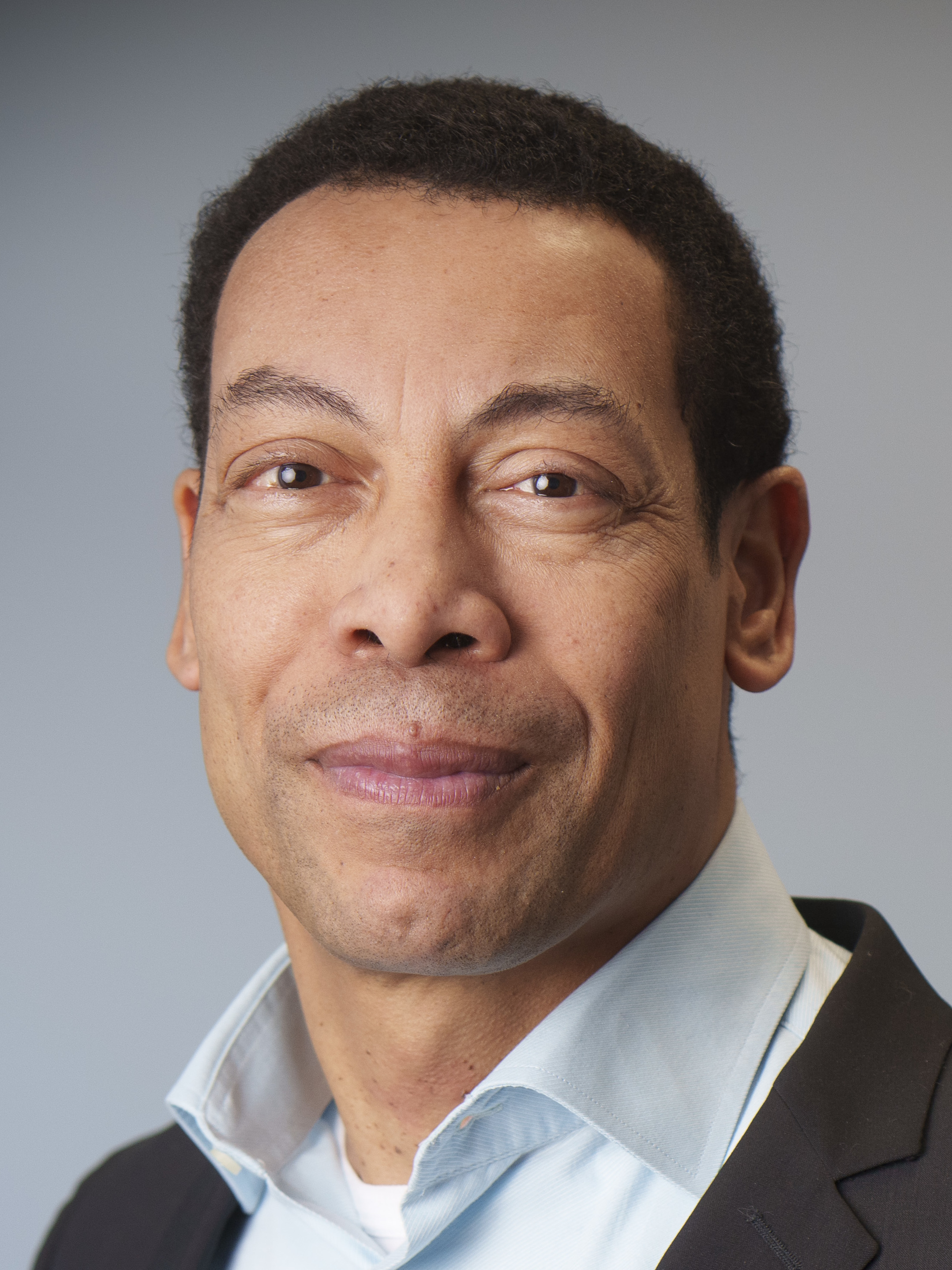
- Weerwind in 2022

Minister for Legal Protection
- In office 10 January 2022 – 2 July 2024
- Prime Minister: Mark Rutte
- Preceded by: Sander Dekker
- Succeeded by: Teun Struycken (as State Secretary for Legal Protection)

Mayor of Almere
- In office 9 September 2015 – 10 January 2022
- Preceded by: Annemarie Jorritsma
- Succeeded by: Ank Bijleveld (acting)

Mayor of Velsen
- In office 16 September 2009 – 9 September 2015

Mayor of Niedorp
- In office 1 December 2004 – 16 September 2009

Personal details
- Born: Franciscus Max Weerwind; 22 September 1964 (age 62) Amsterdam, Netherlands
- Party: Democrats 66

Franciscus Max "Franc" Weerwind (born 22 September 1964) is a Dutch politician of Democrats 66 (D66) who served as minister for legal protection in the cabinet of Prime Minister Mark Rutte from January 2022 until July 2024.

== Early life and education ==
Weerwind was born in Amsterdam and is of Surinamese descent. He grew up in Nieuw-Vennep and studied Public administration at Leiden University between 1986 and 1992 (he did not complete his study). In 1987, while at the university, he became a member of the student fraternity LSV Minerva, at the same time as then crown prince Willem-Alexander.

== Political career ==
In 2000, Weerwind became deputy city manager of Leiderdorp and a year later he became city manager of Wormerland. On 1 December 2004, he was appointed mayor of the municipality of Niedorp, and from September 2009 until September 2015 he was mayor of Velsen. From September 2015 until January 2022 he was mayor of Almere.

In 2022, when Weerwind was Minister for Legal Protection, the Dutch government resumed adoptions of children from the Philippines, Hungary, Lesotho, Taiwan, Thailand and South Africa, after a nearly two-year-freeze on new international adoptions. Inspired by Italian laws against its Mafia, he introduced a bill in 2023 to limit communication for prisoners in the strictest facilities. Interactions with attorneys would be monitored under the legislation to allow for intervention in case of the exchange of external messages or the exertion of pressure on an attorney. Following further amendments by the House of Representatives, the Council of State advised that the bill would violate the constitution, and Weerwind subsequently toned down his proposal.

Weerwind's term as minister ended on 2 July 2024, when the Schoof cabinet was sworn in.

On 16 December 2025 Weerwind was appointed acting mayor of Terneuzen, he starting his duties on 7 January 2026.

== Personal life ==
Weerwind is married to Ilse Overzier. They have two children.

== Electoral history ==
Electoral history of Franc Weerwind
Year	Body	Party	Pos.	Votes	Result		Ref.
Year	Body	Party	Pos.	Votes	Party seats	Individual	Ref.
2023	House of Representatives	Democrats 66	72 (Note: Weerwind participated as a lijstduwer.)	210	9	Lost	

== Notes ==
Political offices
Preceded by Leny Jansen-van der Gevel	Mayor of Niedorp; 2004–2009	Succeeded by Anneke van Dok-van Weele
Preceded by Peter Cammaert	Mayor of Velsen; 2009–2015	Succeeded by Amy Koopmanschap
Preceded by Annemarie Jorritsma	Mayor of Almere; 2015–2022	Succeeded by Ank Bijleveld (acting)
Preceded by Sander Dekker	Minister for Legal Protection; 2022–2024	Succeeded by Teun Struycken as State Secretary for Legal Protection
