= Pieter verLoren van Themaat =

Dutch law professor and civil service worker

Advocate-General of the European Court of Justice
- In office 4 June 1981 – 13 January 1986

Personal details
- Born: 16 March 1916 Rotterdam, Netherlands
- Died: 4 July 2004 (aged 88) Utrecht, Netherlands
- Spouse: Marijke Losecaat Vermeer

Academic background
- Education: Leiden University (LLM, PhD)
- Thesis: Internationaal Belastingrecht. Een studie naar aanleiding van literatuur en verdragen over de uitschakeling van dubbele belasting (1946)
- Doctoral advisor: Eduard Meijers
- Other advisor: Ben Telders

Academic work
- Discipline: European Union law
- Institutions: Utrecht University
- Notable works: The Law of the European Union (with P.J.G. Kapteyn)

Pieter verLoren van Themaat (16 March 1916 – 4 July 2004) was a Dutch law professor and civil service worker. He was professor of socio-economic law at Utrecht University between 1967 and 1981. VerLoren van Themaat was Advocate-General of the European Court of Justice between 1981 and 1986.

== Early life ==
VerLoren was born in Rotterdam on 16 March 1916. Shortly after his birth the family moved to Nijmegen, where his mother soon died while VerLoren was only four years old. The family, part Dutch VerLoren family then once again moved, this time to the newly constructed house Grandpré Molière in the nearby village of Berg en Dal. After finishing his secondary education at the gymnasium in Nijmegen verLoren wished to become an architect. The Great Depression however made such an impression on him that he wished to help in making a societal effort in avoiding or tempering future crises. VerLoren thus chose to study law at Leiden University. He earned his Master of laws degree in 1939. He wished to work on his doctoral thesis on international tax law under the supervision of professor Ben Telders (nl). During World War II he was nominally working for the Government Agency for Iron and Steel (Rijksbureau voor IJzer en Staal), while writing his doctoral dissertation on treaties of the elimination of double tax regimes. On 2 April 1946 he earned his doctorate cum laude from Leiden University under the supervision of Eduard Meijers, as Telders had died shortly before the liberation in Bergen-Belsen concentration camp. His thesis was titled: "Internationaal Belastingrecht –een studie naar aanleiding van literatuur en verdragen over de uitschakeling van dubbele belasting". VerLoren then started working for the Ministry of Economic Affairs.

== Career ==
In 1958 VerLoren moved to Brussels to work for the then recently founded European Economic Community. He was made Director General of the department of competition. Together with European Commissioner Hans von der Groeben he worked on Council Regulation 17/62, which served for forty years as an important foundation of the procedural aspects of European Union competition law. In 1967 he returned to the Netherlands and was appointed professor of socio-economic law at Utrecht University, the first professor in this subject area in the Netherlands. In 1981 he reached the age of retirement. In 1982, he was presented with a Liber Amicorum.

As a result of the accession of Greece to the European Communities in 1981 an expansion in the number of Advocates-General at the European Court of Justice from four to five took place. This new position would rotate among the smaller Member States and it was agreed that it would be first handed to the Netherlands. Although having retired, the Dutch cabinet saw VerLoren as an excellent candidate and he duly became an Advocate-General at the European Court of Justice on 4 June 1981. He served until 13 January 1986.

In 1974 VerLoren was elected a member of the Royal Netherlands Academy of Arts and Sciences.

== Personal life ==
In 1942 he married Marijke Losecaat Vermeer, to whom he was married for over sixty years.

He died on 4 July 2004 in Utrecht.

== Works ==
- P.J.G. Kapteyn & P. VerLoren van Themaat, Introduction to the Law of the European Communities (1972, 1998, 1989); subsequently ' 'Introduction to the Law of the European Union and the European Communities' ' (2008)
