= Joan Melchior Kemper =

Dutch jurist and politician (1776–1824)

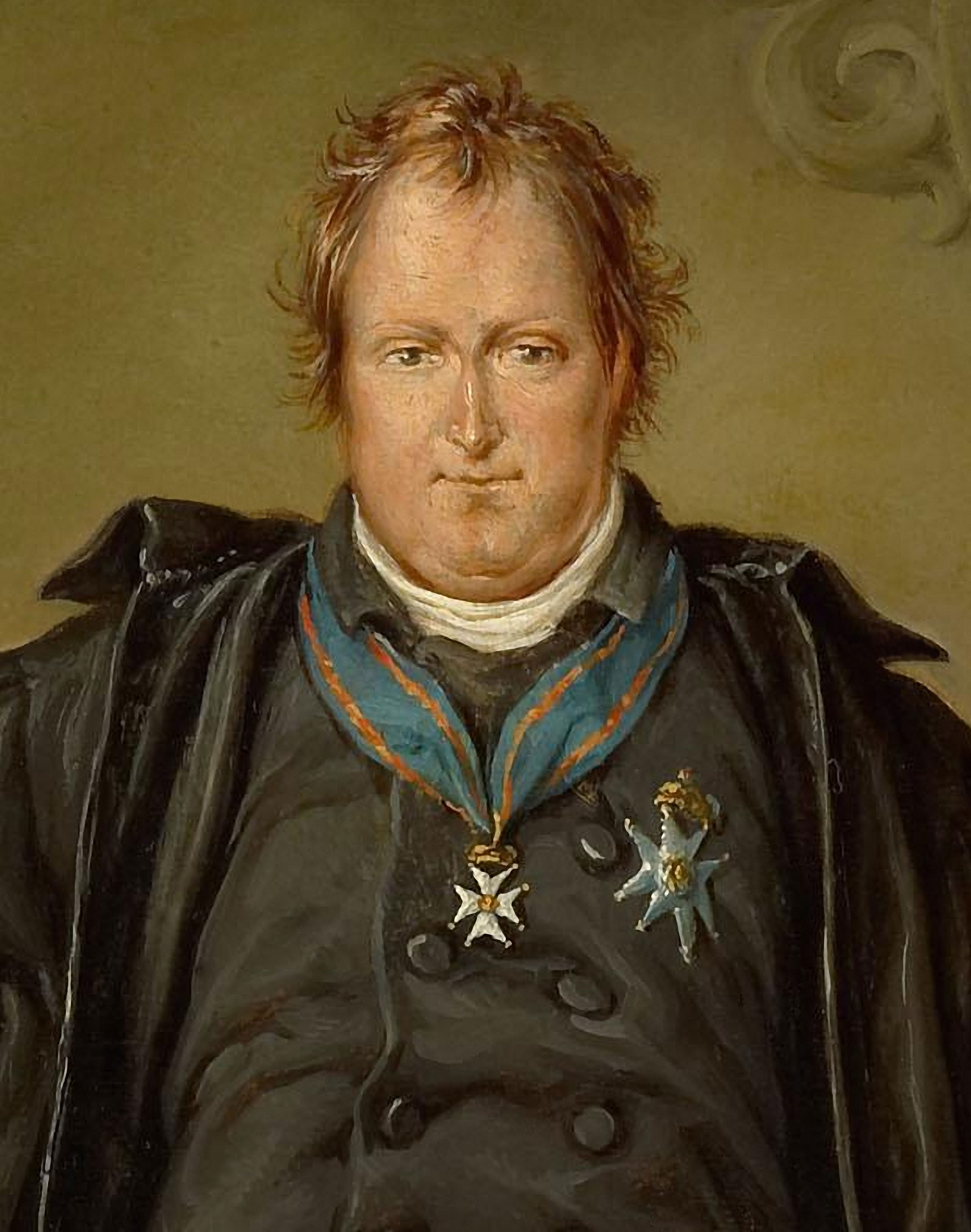
Joan Melchior Kemper (1815)

Joan Melchior Kemper (26 April 1776 – 20 July 1824) was a Dutch jurist and politician.

After studies in Amsterdam and Leiden he taught civil law in Amsterdam beginning in 1806, and natural, public and international law in Leiden beginning in 1809. A student of Cras, he was a prominent advocate of natural law in the tradition of the Enlightenment.

After the French withdrawal from the Netherlands in 1813, Kemper was one of the leading figures in the establishment of the new United Kingdom of the Netherlands. He advised Gijsbert Karel van Hogendorp, together with Elias Canneman and Anton Reinhard Falck, to maintain the governance organization the French had created in the Netherlands.

He drafted various proclamations, including William I's proclamation of sovereignty. In 1817 he was elected to the House of Representatives, the lower chamber of the States General. He led the commission that drafted a Dutch Civil Code, which was however rejected in parliament in favor of the established Napoleonic Code.

== Sources ==
- Jansen, C. J. H. (2001). "Kemper, Joan Melchior". In Michael Stolleis (ed.). Juristen: ein biographisches Lexikon; von der Antike bis zum 20. Jahrhundert (in German) (2nd ed.). München: Beck. p. 356. ISBN 3-406-45957-9.
