= Ank Bijleveld =

Dutch politician

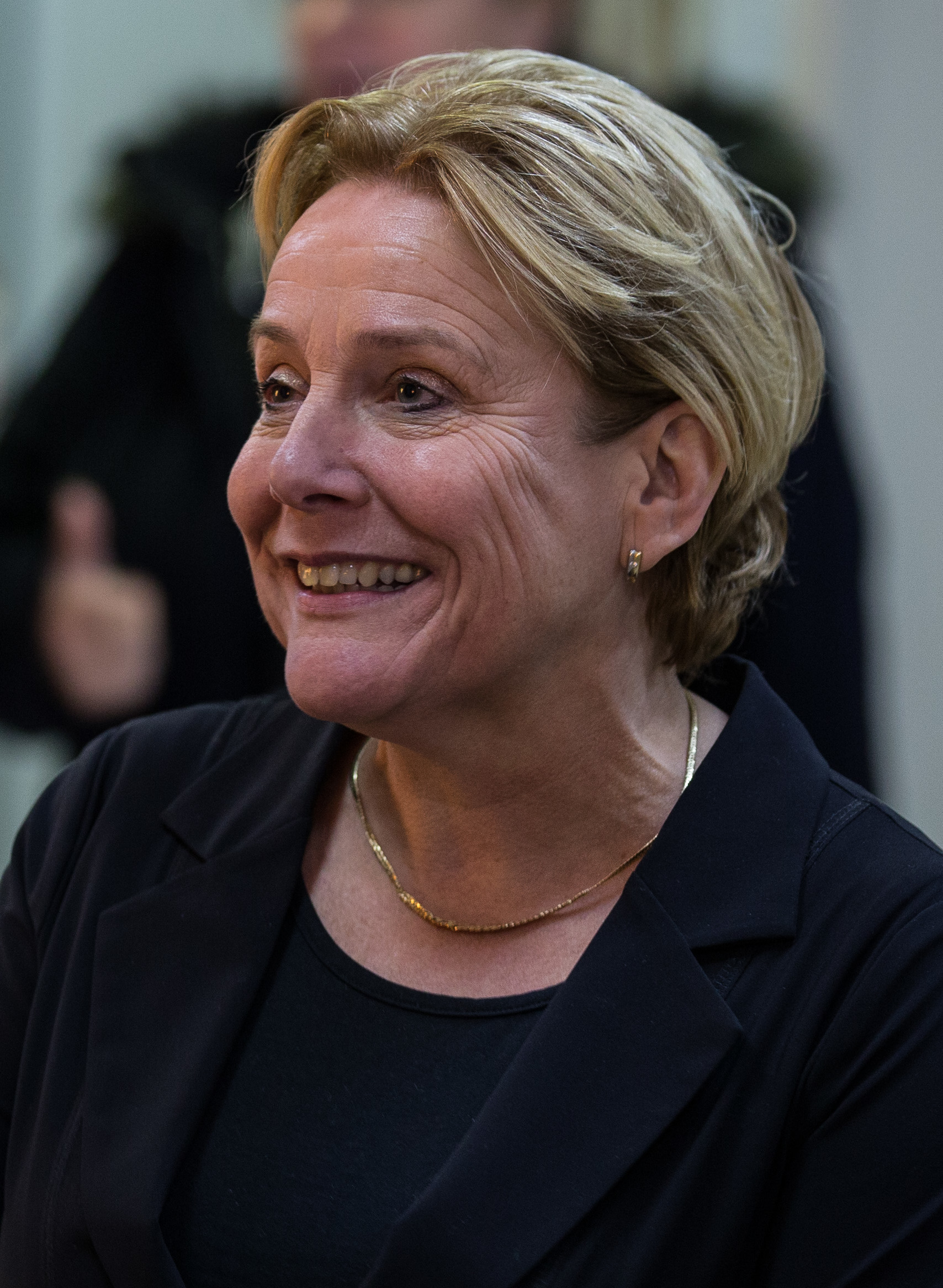
- Bijleveld in 2018

Mayor of Almere
- Acting
- In office 10 January 2022 – 2023
- Preceded by: Franc Weerwind
- Succeeded by: Hein van der Loo

Minister of Defence
- In office 26 October 2017 – 17 September 2021
- Prime Minister: Mark Rutte
- Preceded by: Klaas Dijkhoff
- Succeeded by: Ferdinand Grapperhaus (acting)

King's Commissioner of Overijssel
- In office 1 January 2011 – 26 October 2017
- Monarchs: Beatrix; Willem-Alexander
- Preceded by: Geert Jansen
- Succeeded by: Andries Heidema

State Secretary for the Interior and Kingdom Relations
- In office 22 February 2007 – 14 October 2010
- Prime Minister: Jan Peter Balkenende
- Preceded by: Rob Hessing
- Succeeded by: Raymond Knops (2017)

Mayor of Hof van Twente
- In office 1 January 2001 – 22 February 2007
- Preceded by: Position established
- Succeeded by: Hans Kok

Member of the House of Representatives
- In office 17 June 2010 – 1 January 2011
- In office 16 November 1989 – 16 January 2001

Personal details
- Born: Anna Theodora Bernardina Schouten; 17 March 1962 (age 64) IJsselmuiden, Netherlands
- Party: Christian Democratic Appeal
- Spouse: Riekele Bijleveld (m. 1984)
- Children: 2
- Education: University of Twente (BPA, MPA)

Anna Theodora Bernardina "Ank" Bijleveld-Schouten (born 17 March 1962) is a Dutch politician of the Christian Democratic Appeal (CDA). She served as Minister of Defence in the third cabinet of Prime Minister Mark Rutte from 26 October 2017 to 17 September 2021.

A civil servant by occupation, she served as a member of the House of Representatives from 16 November 1989 until 16 January 2001, when she was appointed Mayor of Hof van Twente, serving from 1 January 2001 until 22 February 2007. She resigned after she was appointed as State Secretary for the Interior and Kingdom Relations in the Fourth Balkenende cabinet, serving from 22 February 2007 until 14 October 2010. After the election of 2010, Bijleveld returned to the House of Representatives serving from 17 June 2010 until 1 January 2011 when she resigned after she was appointed as King's Commissioner of Overijssel. Following the election of 2017 Bijleveld was asked to become Minister of Defence in the Third Rutte cabinet. Bijleveld accepted and resigned as King's Commissioner of Overijssel the same day she took office as the new Minister of Defence on 26 October 2017.

== Early life and education ==
Bijleveld was born in the Dutch province of Overijssel. Between 1980 and 1986, she studied public administration at the University of Twente.

== Political career ==
In 1986 Bijleveld became a member of the Enschede municipal council for the Christian Democratic Appeal. She served as a Member of the House of Representatives from 16 November 1989 until 16 January 2001. She was Mayor of Hof van Twente from 1 January 2001 until 22 February 2007, when she resigned to become the State secretary for the Interior and Kingdom Relations in the Fourth Balkenende cabinet until 14 October 2010. On 17 June 2010 she again became a member of the House of Representatives. She was an MP till 1 January 2011 when she became King's Commissioner of Overijssel.

=== Minister of Defence, 2017–2021 ===
Bijleveld left that position in 2017 as she was appointed to be Minister of Defence.

Early in her tenure, Bijleveld oversaw Dutch efforts to disrupt a 2018 attempt by Russian intelligence agents to hack the Organisation for the Prohibition of Chemical Weapons (OPCW).

In October 2019, journalists from NRC and NOS revealed that an air raid on the Iraqi city Hawija in early June 2015 had been carried out by Dutch F16s. This bombing of a weapons depot resulted in 70 civilian deaths. Bijleveld's predecessor, Jeanine Hennis-Plasschaert, was aware of this, but had incorrectly informed the House of Representatives about this. Bijleveld was criticized, because she too could have informed the House of Representatives about this earlier. For this reason GroenLinks-parliamentarian Isabelle Diks filed a motion of no confidence on 5 November 2019, which was supported by 71 parliamentarians. In this parliamentary debate Rutte and Bijleveld stated that the number of seventy civilian deaths was uncertain and that this was also not known to the United States Central Command. After inquiries from NRC and NOS, United States Central Command however confirmed that they have known this number of casualties for a while now. The fact that journalists could get this information led to a fourth debate about this bombing. In this debate, Bijleveld survived another vote of no confidence, which was supported by only 69 parliamentarians.

Bijleveld resigned on 17 September 2021 after the House of Representatives filed a motion of disapproval on how she and Sigrid Kaag handled the evacuation of Afghanistan, even though the day before she said she wouldn't resign.

== Electoral history ==
Electoral history of Ank Bijleveld
| Year | Body | Party | Pos. | Votes | Result | | Ref. |
| Year | Body | Party | Pos. | Votes | Party seats | Individual | Ref. |
|---|---|---|---|---|---|---|---|
| 1994 | House of Representatives | Christian Democratic Appeal | 21 | 1,591 | 34 | Won | |
| 1998 | House of Representatives | Christian Democratic Appeal | 2 | 71,540 | 29 | Won | |
| 1998 | House of Representatives | Christian Democratic Appeal | 2 | 49,036 | 21 | Won | |
| 2021 | House of Representatives | Christian Democratic Appeal | 51 (Note: Bijleveld participated as lijstduwer.) | 971 | 15 | Won | |

== Personal life ==
Bijleveld has been married to Riekele Bijleveld since 1984 (her husband has been a member of the municipal council of Hof van Twente on behalf of the CDA party since 2018) and has two daughters. She is a Roman Catholic.

== Notes ==
Political offices
| Preceded by Office established | Mayor of Hof van Twente; 2001–2007 | Succeeded by Hans Kok |
| Preceded by Rob Hessing | State Secretary for the Interior and Kingdom Relations; 2007–2010 | Succeeded by Raymond Knops (2017) |
| Preceded by Geert Jansen | King's Commissioner of Overijssel; 2011–2017 | Succeeded by Andries Heidema |
| Preceded by Klaas Dijkhoff | Minister of Defence; 2017–2021 | Succeeded by Ferdinand Grapperhaus (acting) |
| Preceded by Franc Weerwind | Mayor of Almere; 2022–2023 (acting) | Succeeded by Hein van der Loo |
