= List of members of the European Coal and Steel Community Parliament for the Netherlands, 1952–1958 =

This is a list of members of the European Coal and Steel Community Parliament for the Netherlands in the 1952 to 1958 session, ordered by name and by party.

== List ==
Name	National party	Start date	End date	Ref.
Pieter Blaisse	Catholic People's Party	10 September 1952	1 January 1958	
Marinus van der Goes van Naters	Labour Party	10 September 1952	1 January 1958	
Cees Hazenbosch	Anti-Revolutionary Party	6 May 1955	1 January 1958	
Martinus Maria Aloysius Antonius Janssen	Catholic People's Party	27 November 1956	1 January 1958	
Paul Kapteijn	Labour Party	10 September 1952	10 October 1956	
Marga Klompé	Catholic People's Party	10 September 1952	17 October 1956	
Henk Korthals	People's Party for Freedom and Democracy	10 September 1952	1 January 1958	
Franz Lichtenauer	Christian Historical Union	5 November 1957	1 January 1958	
Gerard Nederhorst	Labour Party	10 September 1952	1 January 1958	
Willem Rip	Anti-Revolutionary Party	10 September 1952	1 January 1958	
Maan Sassen	Catholic People's Party	10 September 1952	1 January 1958	
Sieuwert Bruins Slot	Anti-Revolutionary Party	10 September 1952	22 February 1955	
Gerrit Vixseboxse	Christian Historical Union	10 September 1952	10 October 1957	
