= Franz Lichtenauer =

Dutch politician (1900–1987)

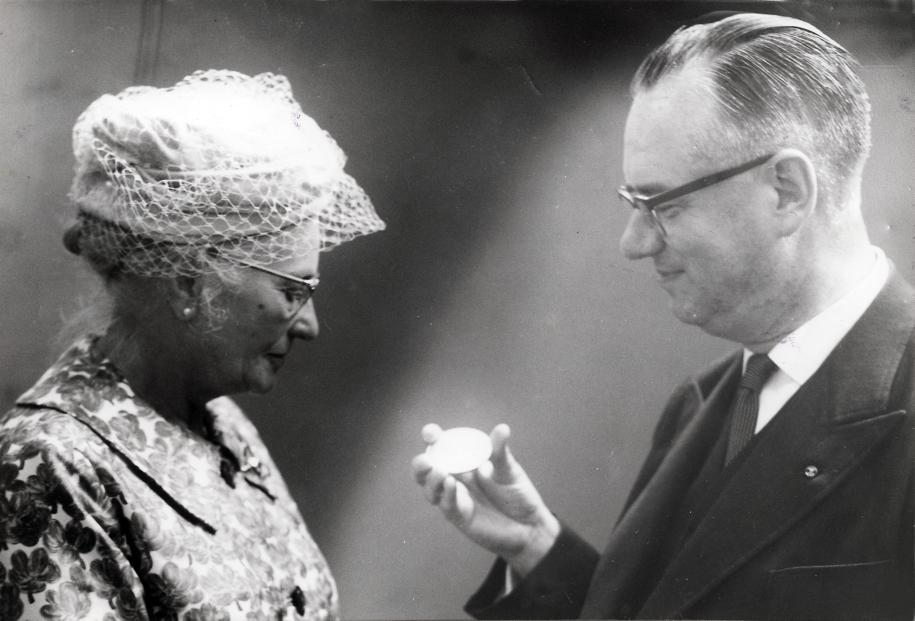
- For his services at the Chamber of Commerce in Rotterdam, Lichtenauer receives a medal of honor which he shows to his wife. September 5, 1961.

Personal details
- Born: Wilhelm Franz Lichtenauer; May 11, 1900 Rotterdam, Netherlands
- Died: February 5, 1987 (aged 86) Rotterdam, Netherlands
- Party: CHU

Wilhelm Franz Lichtenauer (May 11, 1900 – February 5, 1987) was a Dutch administrator and politician.

== Life and work ==
Lichtenauer graduated in law from the University of Leiden in 1922, and then started as deputy secretary of the Rotterdam Chamber of Commerce. Ten years later, he earned his doctorate in law cum laude from Leiden under Eduard Meijers with a dissertation entitled "De vernietigende verjaring en aanverwante rechtsfiguren beschouwd naar wezen, begrenzing en onderlinge verhouding." ("The nullification statute of limitations and related legal figures considered in terms of their essence, limits, and relationship to each other").

Lichtenauer was an expert in maritime and commercial law, who, as secretary and later chairman of the Rotterdam Chamber of Commerce, played an important role in the development of the Rotterdam port. He also had a significant part in its reconstruction.

In the Dutch Senate from 1956 to 1961, he dealt with transport and water management and economic issues. He also served in the European Parliament. In 1959, he was a serious candidate for a ministerial position.

He was very active as an amateur historian. He made significant contributions to Rotterdam in the fields of church, state, and society, and for culture and science.

For his services, Lichtenauer was awarded the Laurenspenning in 1971, a high municipal honor from the city of Rotterdam. In 1971 he was appointed Commander of the Order of Orange-Nassau.
