= Arno Rutte =

Dutch politician

State Secretary for Legal Protection
- In office 5 September 2025 – 23 February 2026
- Minister: Foort van Oosten
- Cabinet: Schoof
- Preceded by: Teun Struycken
- Succeeded by: Claudia van Bruggen

Member of the House of Representatives
- In office 20 September 2012 – 13 October 2019

Personal details
- Born: 24 April 1972 (age 54) Hengelo
- Party: People's Party for Freedom and Democracy

Arno Rutte (born 24 April 1972 in Hengelo) is a Dutch politician. As a member of the People's Party for Freedom and Democracy (VVD), he was an MP between 20 September 2012 and 13 October 2019, after he had announced his departure in August 2019. Between September 2025 and February 2026, he was state secretary for legal protection in the demissionary Schoof cabinet.

Previously, he was a member of the municipal council of Groningen from 2010 to 2012. He is also the singer of the band 'Hairy Harry & The Ladyshavers'.

He is unrelated to former Prime Minister and Party Leader Mark Rutte.

Political offices
Preceded by Teun Struycken	State Secretary for Legal Protection; 2025–2026
