= Pieter Godfried Maria van Meeuwen =

Dutch politician (1899–1982)

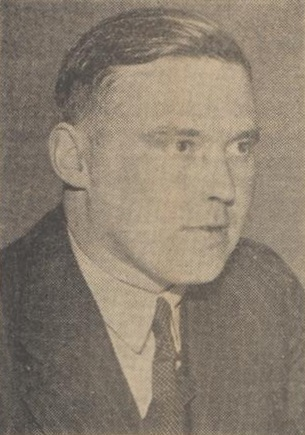
P.G.M. van Meeuwen

Jonkheer Pieter Godfried Maria van Meeuwen (11 March 1899 in 's-Hertogenbosch – 9 February 1982 in Ulestraten) was a Dutch judge and a politician.

Van Meeuwen studied law at Leiden University and obtained his degree in 1924. After working as a lawyer in 's-Hertogenbosch until 1927 he was a court clerk at the local arrondissement court until 1930. Van Meeuwen subsequently became judge at the same court, which he remained until 1936. He then took up a similar position at The Hague court, which he kept until 1949. He then acquired a seat in the court of justice (Dutch:Gerechtshof) in the same city. He stayed on until 1951, and then took up a similar position at the court of justice of 's-Hertogenbosch. In 1955 he transferred to the canton court of Heerlen, where he served until April 1969.

After World War II Van Meeuwen was vice-president of the Bijzonder Gerechtshof of The Hague until 1 December 1946, and continued as president until 1 February 1949. During this period he sentenced Hanns Albin Rauter to death.

Van Meeuwen was active in politics as well. He was a member of the Roman Catholic State Party and its successor party the Catholic People's Party. He was a member of the States of North Brabant (15 April 1931–January 1936) and the States of Limburg (6 July 1954 – 1 December 1956). Van Meeuwen was a member of the Senate of the Netherlands from 6 November 1956 to 16 September 1969.

== Private life ==
Van Meeuwen married Louisa Augusta Johanna Maria van Lanschot; they had five children.

== Distinction ==
- Knight of the Order of the Netherlands Lion (1964)
