= Benjamin Marius Telders =

Dutch law professor (1903–1945)

Ben Telders
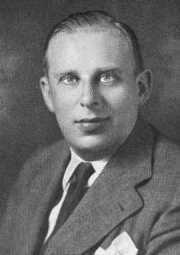
- Born: Benjamin Marius Telders; 19 March 1903; The Hague, Netherlands
- Died: 6 April 1945 (aged 42); Bergen-Belsen concentration camp, Nazi Germany
- Awards: Dutch Cross of Resistance

Academic background
- Education: Leiden University (LLM, PhD)
- Thesis: Staat en volkenrecht: Proeve van rechtvaardiging van Hegel's volkenrechtsleer (1927)
- Doctoral advisor: Willem van Eysinga

Academic work
- Discipline: Public international law
- Institutions: Leiden University
- Notable students: Pieter verLoren van Themaat

Benjamin Marius Telders (19 March 1903 – 6 April 1945) was a professor of law at Leiden University. He is known for standing up for his belief in the rule of law and civil society during the German Occupation.

From 1938 he became involved in Dutch politics; he was party chairman of the Liberal State Party from 1938–1945.

Rudolph Cleveringa and Telders led the resistance to a declaration requiring the dismissal of 'non-Aryan' staff that all professors were told to sign in October 1940. He was arrested that December and imprisoned in Scheveningen. He died of typhus in Bergen-Belsen concentration camp shortly before the end of the war. He was awarded the Dutch Cross of Resistance on 9 May 1946 (posthumously).

Telders Students Society of International Law, the Telders Foundation, and the Telders International Law Moot Court Competition are named after him.
