= Bitvavo =

Dutch cryptocurrency exchange

- Type: Private company
- Industry: Financial services
- Founded: 2018; 8 years ago
- Founders: Mark Nuvelstijn; Tim Baardse; Jelle de Boer
- Headquarters: Keizersgracht 281; 1016 ED Amsterdam; North Holland; Netherlands
- Area served: Netherlands
- Website: bitvavo.com

Bitvavo is a Dutch cryptocurrency exchange founded in 2018 by programmers Tim Baardse, Jelle de Boer and business administrator Mark Nuvelstijn.

== History ==
In 2020, the company received registration from the Dutch Central Bank (De Nederlandsche Bank) as a digital asset service provider, allowing it to operate legally within the Netherlands under European anti-money-laundering regulations.

In 2023, Bitvavo claimed to control around 40% of the Dutch cryptocurrency market and to have about one million customers. According to Quote, Bitvavo was the largest cryptocurrency trading platform in the Netherlands in 2024.

== Regulation and compliance ==
Bitvavo B.V. is officially registered as a crypto service provider with De Nederlandsche Bank (DNB), the Dutch central bank responsible for overseeing financial institutions under the country’s implementation of EU anti-money-laundering regulations. This registration requires compliance with the Money Laundering and Terrorist Financing (Prevention) Act and the Sanctions Act.

Client assets are safeguarded by a separate legal foundation, Stichting Bitvavo Payments, which holds customers’ fiat and digital assets in segregated accounts to protect them from corporate liabilities. This structure is common among Dutch financial service providers that handle client funds and ensures legal separation between operational and custodial entities.

The Bitvavo group also includes Bitvavo Group B.V., which functions as the holding company, and Bitvavo Custody B.V., responsible for certain custody and lending-related operations.

In June 2025, Bitvavo also received authorisation under the EU’s new Markets in Crypto-Assets (MiCA) framework from the Autoriteit Financiële Markten (AFM), allowing it to operate across the European Economic Area under harmonised crypto-asset service provider rules.

Since 2022, Bitvavo has offered a one-time insurance guarantee against hacks up to €100,000.

== Incidents and controversies ==
Bitvavo has faced several incidents in recent years.

In September 2022, the company acknowledged that a technical misconfiguration exposed the personal data of eight users for about 15 minutes. Bitvavo clarified that no funds were affected and reported the issue to the Dutch Data Protection Authority.

In January 2023, Bitvavo temporarily faced financial issues after lending €280 million to crypto service provider Gemini, a subsidiary of the Digital Currency Group, which was sued by the SEC.

In November 2023, a system outage caused by its infrastructure provider left the platform temporarily inaccessible.

In April 2024, a data breach affecting a limited number of customers was reported.

In October 2024, Cybernews reported that Bitvavo’s management had long-term access to customer data.

Then in July 2025, CEO Mark Nuvelstijn resigned following media reports alleging money-laundering and insider-trading links, according to Silicon Canals and NL Times.
