= Volkert Doeksen =

Dutch investor

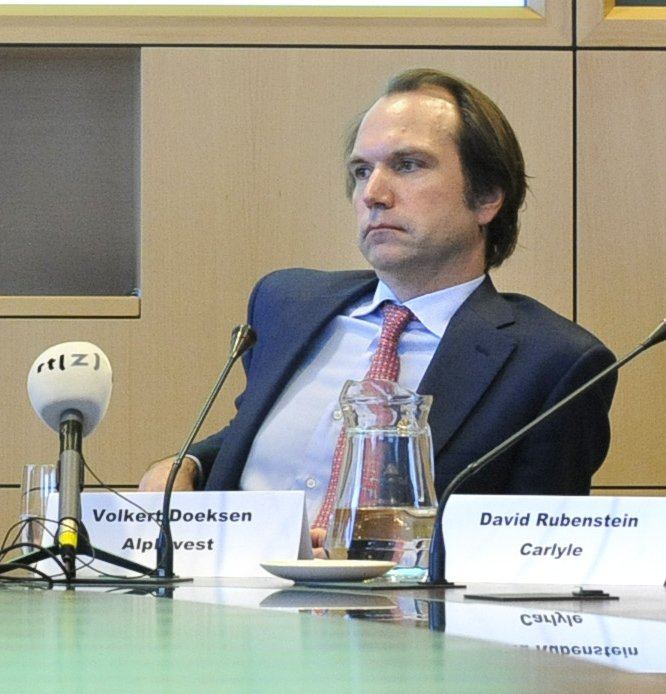
- Born: 23 January 1963 (age 63); Netherlands
- Occupations: Private equity investor CEO, AlpInvest Partners

Volkert Doeksen (born 23 January 1963) is a private equity investor and the founder of AlpInvest Partners (originally NIB Capital). AlpInvest Partners is one of the largest global private equity investment managers, overseeing over €40 billion in assets under management. Today, he serves as managing partner and Chief Executive Officer of AlpInvest Partners which has offices in Amsterdam, Hong Kong and New York.

Additionally, Volkert is member of the Board of NXP Semiconductors in the Netherlands. He also serves on the Advisory Board of private equity firm Warburg Pincus.

Prior to founding AlpInvest, Doeksen was a director of Dresdner Kleinwort Benson (today Dresdner Kleinwort), managing over $3 billion of private equity investments. From 1992 to 1994, Doeksen served as head of the bank's Benelux region, based in the firm's London office. In 1994, he moved to New York to head up DKB's private equity investments, including U.S. leveraged buyouts, mezzanine debt and fund of funds.

Prior to Kleinwort Benson, Doeksen worked as an investment banker focusing on mergers and acquisitions for Dillon Read from 1989 through 1992. He began his career as a financial analyst in corporate finance for Morgan Stanley International in London in 1987.

Doeksen received his M.A. in Law from Universiteit Leiden (The University of Leiden).

== Other ==
Doeksen serves as the Chairman of the Millennium Promise Netherlands Foundation and serves on the board of directors.

He also serves on the board of the digital consultancy SparkOptimus.

Doeksen is a Dutch national and hails from the Doeksen family which controls various shipping and transportation concerns in the Netherlands.
