= Ferdinand Grapperhaus =

Dutch politician

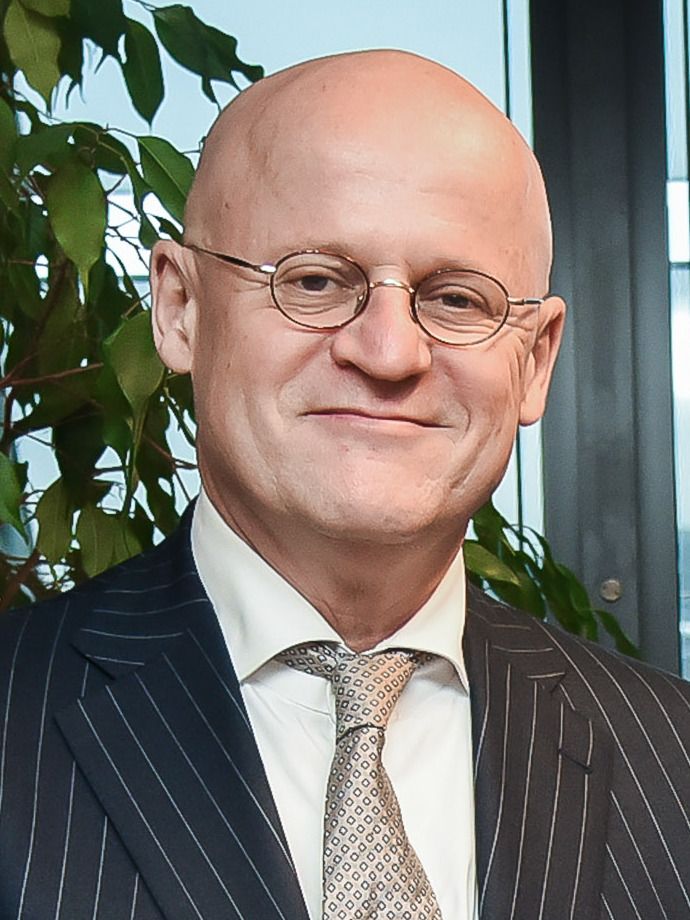
- Grapperhaus in 2019

Minister of Defence
- Acting
- In office 17 September 2021 – 24 September 2021
- Prime Minister: Mark Rutte
- Preceded by: Ank Bijleveld
- Succeeded by: Henk Kamp

Minister of Justice and Security
- In office 26 October 2017 – 10 January 2022
- Prime Minister: Mark Rutte
- Preceded by: Stef Blok
- Succeeded by: Dilan Yeşilgöz-Zegerius

Personal details
- Born: Ferdinand Bernhard Joseph Grapperhaus; 8 November 1959 (age 66) Amsterdam, Netherlands
- Party: Christian Democratic Appeal
- Education: University of Amsterdam (LLB, LLM, PhD)

Ferdinand Bernhard Joseph "Ferd" Grapperhaus (born 8 November 1959) is a Dutch politician who served as Minister of Justice and Security in the Third Rutte cabinet from 26 October 2017 until 10 January 2022. He is a member of the Christian Democratic Appeal (CDA).

== Family and education ==
Grapperhaus was born in Amsterdam. He is the eldest son of Ferd Grapperhaus, who served as State Secretary for Finance from 1967 to 1971. Grapperhaus went to the secondary school Aloysius College in The Hague in between 1971 and 1977. He studied Dutch law at the University of Amsterdam where he obtained an LLM degree in constitutional law in 1984. In 1995, Grapperhaus was awarded a PhD degree in labour law from the same university, under the supervision of Paul F. van der Heijden.

== Career ==
=== Professional life ===
A jurist by occupation, Grapperhaus worked as a lawyer for the law firm Schut & Grosheide from 1984 until 1998 when he became a partner at the law firm Loeff Claeys Verbeke. In 1999, part of Loeff Claeys Verbeke merged with Allen & Overy (the other part continuing as Loyens & Loeff), and Grapperhaus became partner at the A&O branch in Amsterdam. He served as managing partner for the Amsterdam branch from 1 February 2015 until 1 September 2017. Grapperhaus has been an extraordinary professor of European labour law at the Maastricht University since 1 January 2005. In February 2023, he became head of legal affairs of Deloitte Legal, the legal branch of accountancy and consultancy firm Deloitte, succeeding Frederieke Leeflang. Since 1 June 2023, Grapperhaus is also appointed full professor of "Rule of Law, Society and Legal Practice" at Erasmus University Rotterdam.

=== Politics ===
He served as a member of the Social and Economic Council 1 April 2006 until 22 May 2015. Following the election of 2017 Grapperhaus was asked to become Minister of Justice and Security in the Third Rutte cabinet. Grapperhaus accepted and resigned as a professor the same day he took office as the new Minister of Justice and Security on 26 October 2017. During his tenure, the name of his ministry was changed from "Ministry of Security and Justice" to "Ministry of Justice and Security", a move costing €2,000,000.

== Controversy ==
As a response to parliamentary questions following the Argos documentary 'Shards of glass and dark rituals', Grapperhaus said on 27 August 2020 that there would be 'no independent investigation into Ritual Abuse' of children in the Netherlands. The Green Left, the Socialist Party and the Labour Party criticised the minister for his decision. On the same day, Grapperhaus responded to public controversy when news media reported about the lack of social distancing at his own wedding amid the COVID-19 pandemic in the Netherlands. He agreed to pay a 390 euro fine. On 26 June 2021, Grapperhuis sang a made-up song on Dutch TV about throwing away protective face masks just as a further wave of COVID-19 infections in the Netherlands was taking hold. Two weeks later there were 10,000 cases per day recorded. On 13 October, the House of Representatives approved a motion in which the PvdA, GL and the SP requested that an independent investigation be conducted into the nature and extent of "organized sadistic abuse of children", bypassing Grapperhaus' original refusal to investigate.

== Electoral history ==
Electoral history of Ferdinand Grapperhaus
Year	Body	Party	Pos.	Votes	Result		Ref.
Year	Body	Party	Pos.	Votes	Party seats	Individual	Ref.
2021	House of Representatives	Christian Democratic Appeal	50	1,502	15 / 150	Lost	
2026	Amsterdam Municipal Council	Christian Democratic Appeal	50 (Note: Grapperhaus participated as lijstduwer.)	72	1 / 45	Lost	
2026	Amsterdam-West District Committee	Christian Democratic Appeal	6	149	0 / 15	Lost	

== Notes ==
Political offices
Preceded by Stef Blok	Minister of Justice and Security; 2017–2022	Succeeded by Dilan Yeşilgöz-Zegerius
Preceded by Ank Bijleveld	Minister of Defence; Acting; 2021	Succeeded by Henk Kamp
