= Ministry of Justice and Security =

Government ministry of the Netherlands

- Ministerie van Justitie en Veiligheid
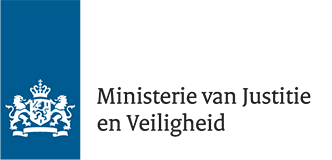

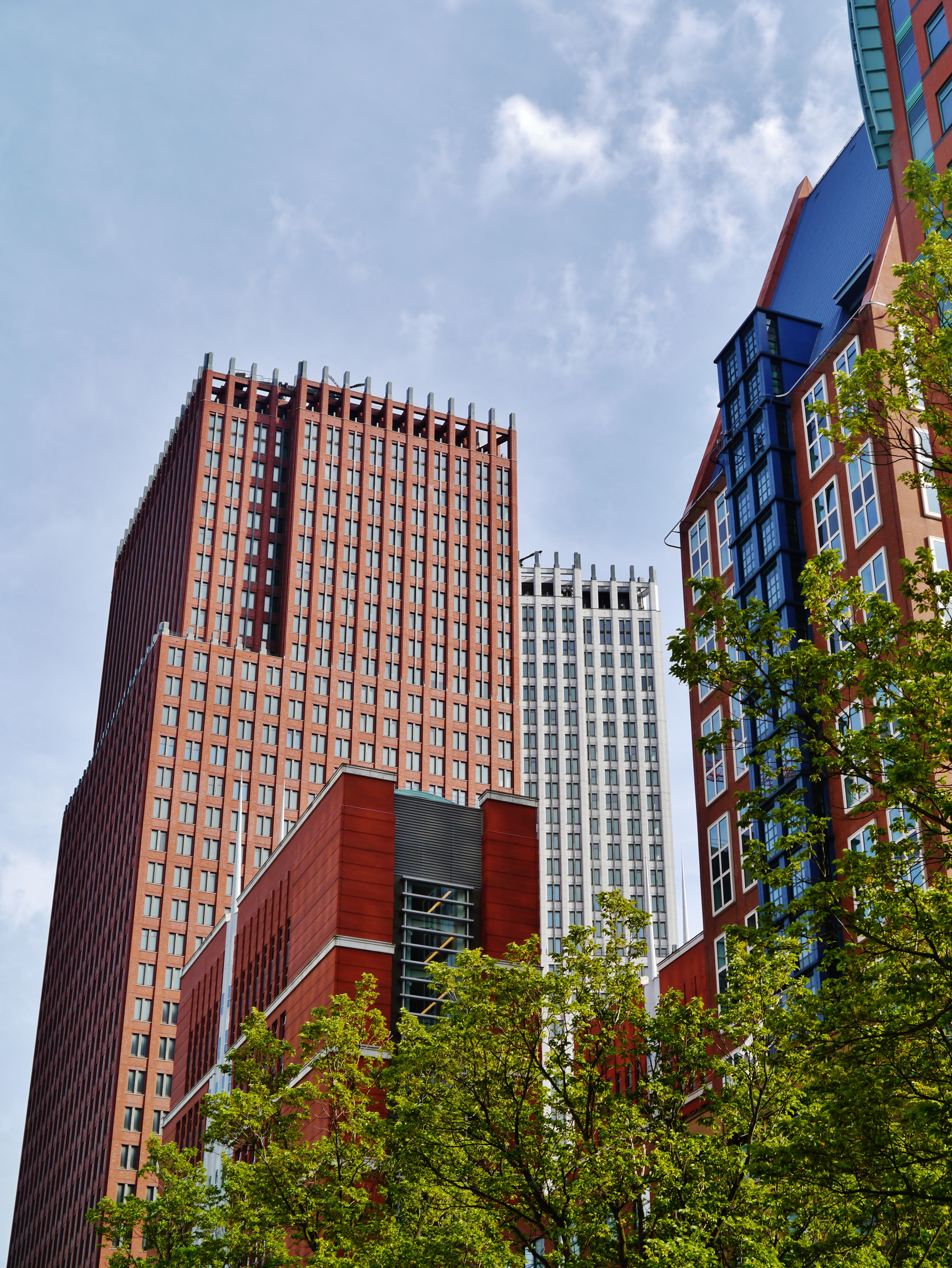
- Current headquarters, the JuBi Building complex

Department overview
- Formed: 12 March 1798; 228 years ago
- Jurisdiction: Kingdom of the Netherlands
- Headquarters: Schedeldoekshaven 100, The Hague, Netherlands
- Employees: 30,000
- Annual budget: €11.1 billion (2018)
- Minister responsible: David van Weel, Minister of Justice and Security
- Deputy Minister responsible: Claudia van Bruggen, State Secretary for Justice and Security
- Website: Ministry of Justice and Security

The Ministry of Justice and Security (Dutch: Ministerie van Justitie en Veiligheid; JenV) is the Dutch ministry responsible for justice, imprisonment and public security. The ministry was created in 1798 as the Department of Justice, before it became in 1876 the Ministry of Justice. In 2010, it took over the public safety duties from the Ministry of the Interior and Kingdom Relations and became Ministry of Security and Justice. In 2017 the ministry was renamed to Ministry of Justice and Security.

== Responsibilities ==
The ministry has the legal tasks of:

- providing workable legislation for the public, the government and the courts;
- preventing crime, in order to build a safer society;
- protecting youth and children;
- enforcing the law, in order to build a safer society;
- providing independent, accessible and effective administration of justice and legal aid;
- providing support to the victims of crime;
- providing fair, consistent and effective enforcement of punishment and other sanctions;
- regulating immigration into the Netherlands;

It is also responsible for the coordination of counter-terrorism policy.

Because it shares many responsibilities and has twin buildings (both old and new) with the Ministry of the Interior and Kingdom Relations, they are sometimes called the twin ministries.

== Organisation ==
The ministry is headed by Minister Foort van Oosten, who is supported by State Secretaries Ingrid Coenradie (Justice and Security) and Arno Rutte (Legal Protection). It employs almost 30,000 civil servants, located at the ministry in the Hague and all around the Netherlands. The ministry's main office is located in the centre of the Hague in the same building as the Ministry of the Interior and Kingdom Relations. The civil service is headed by a secretary-general and a deputy secretary-general, who head a system of three directorates-general:

- The Directorate-General for Legislation, International Affairs and Immigration
- The Directorate-General for Prevention, Youth and Sanctions
- The Directorate-General for the Administration of Justice and Law Enforcement

The Board of Procurators General (Dutch: Raad van Procureurs-Generaal) which heads the Public Prosecution Service (in Dutch: Openbaar Ministerie, OM) is a relatively independent organisation which forms part of the Judiciary and prosecutes persons suspected of breaking the law.

The Netherlands Forensic Institute is an autonomous division of the Ministry of Justice, falling under the Directorate-General for the Administration of Justice and Law Enforcement. The Custodial Institutions Agency is an agency of the ministry.

== See also ==
- List of ministers of justice of the Netherlands
