= Teun Struycken (born 1969) =

Dutch lawyer and politician (born 1969)

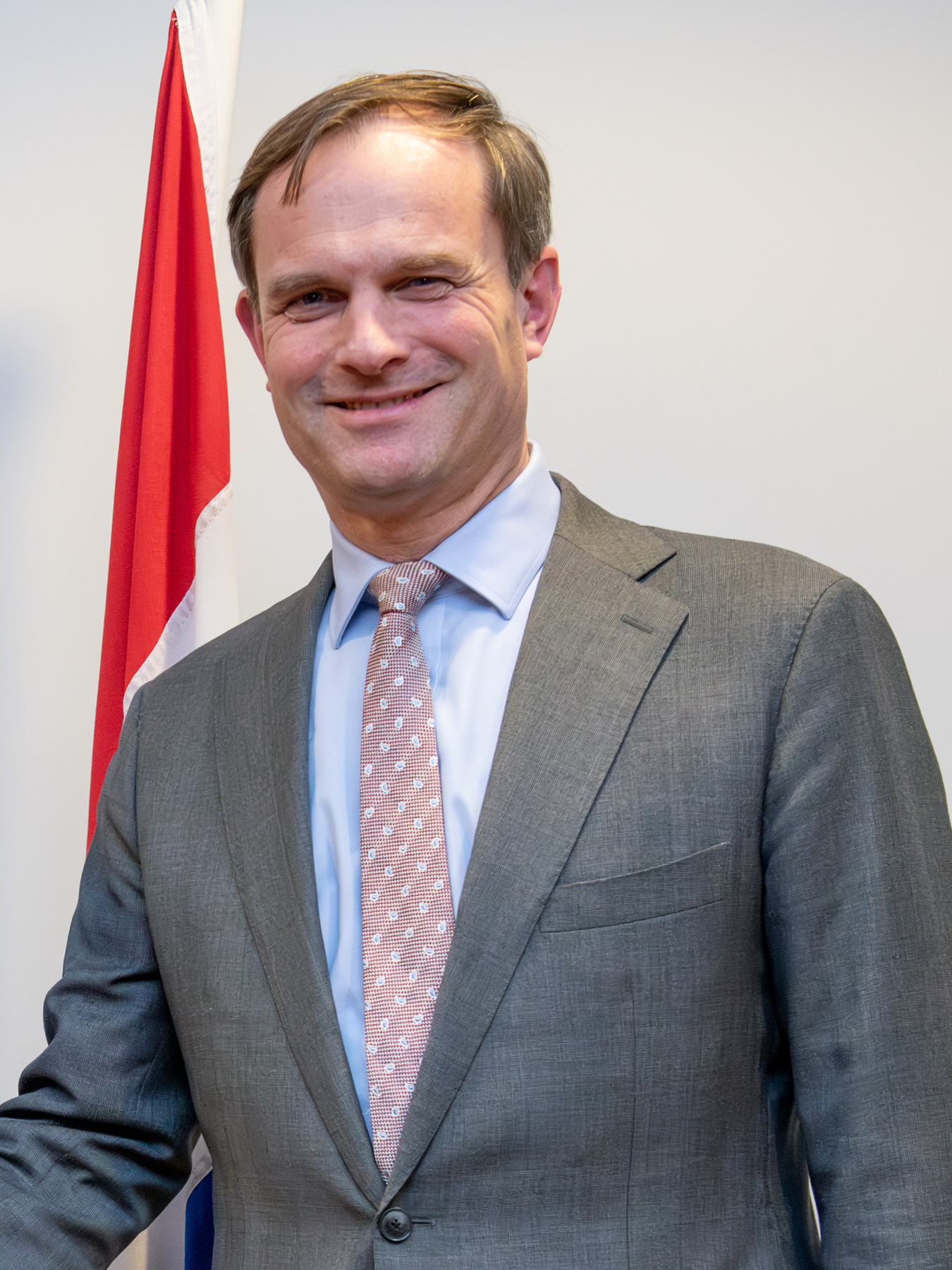
- Struycken in 2025

State Secretary for Legal Protection
- In office 2 July 2024 – 22 August 2025 Serving with Ingrid Coenradie
- Prime Minister: Dick Schoof
- Minister: David van Weel
- Preceded by: Franc Weerwind (as Minister for Legal Protection)
- Succeeded by: Arno Rutte

Personal details
- Born: Teun Huib Desiderius Struycken; 30 October 1969 (age 56) Nijmegen, Netherlands
- Party: Independent
- Relatives: Teun Struycken (grandfather)
- Occupation: Lawyer; politician

Academic background
- Education: Leiden University (LLM); Radboud University Nijmegen (PhD)
- Thesis: De numerus clausus in het goederenrecht (2007)
- Doctoral advisors: Bas Kortmann and Corjo Jansen

Academic work
- Discipline: Private law
- Institutions: Utrecht University

Teun Huib Desiderius Struycken (Dutch: [tøːn ˈstrœykə(n)]; born 30 October 1969) is a Dutch lawyer and independent politician. He served as State Secretary for Legal Protection in the Schoof cabinet between July 2024 and August 2025, on behalf of the New Social Contract (NSC) party. He served as professor of private law at Utrecht University and was a lawyer at NautaDutilh.

== Education and career ==
Struycken studied law at Leiden University, and he subsequently went to universities in Paris and Oxford. He obtained his PhD at Radboud University Nijmegen. He started working at law firm NautaDutilh in 2002, where his specialties were banking and securities law, and he has written for legal publications. In September 2008, he was promoted to partner at NautaDutilh. He was also appointed professor of private law at Utrecht University, with a teaching focus on European property law.

In 2010, he received the publication award of the Vereniging voor Burgerlijk Recht (Association for Civil Law) for an analysis of the Hamm q.q./ABN AMRO judgment published in the Tijdschrift voor Insolventierecht. He later served as editor-in-chief of Bedrijfsjuridische berichten and as a contributing editor to the journal Nederlands Internationaal Privaatrecht.

After the PVV, VVD, NSC, and BBB formed the Schoof cabinet, Struycken was sworn in as State Secretary for Legal Protection on 2 July 2024, succeeding Franc Weerwind. He was nominated on behalf of NSC, which had been founded the year before by Pieter Omtzigt, but Struycken said he would not become a member of the party. His portfolio as state secretary includes the judiciary, the legal system, legal aid, sanctions policy, juvenile justice policy, family law, crime prevention, private law, Dutch nationality law, bankruptcy law, copyright and intellectual property law, betting and gambling, and personal data protection. Following a pilot by his predecessor, Struycken worked on a bill to offer free legal assistance for parents facing the out-of-home placement of their children or the termination of their parental authority, along with other reforms to prioritize reintegration and preserve sibling bonds. As State Secretary, Struycken was jointly responsible with Minister of the Interior Judith Uitermark for a proposal to establish a constitutional court empowered to review legislation for compliance with the Constitution of the Netherlands. He opposed a ban on high-risk gambling products and instead advocated adjustments to online gambling in order to strengthen protections against gambling addiction. Following the resignation of State Secretary Ingrid Coenradie (PVV) after the collapse of the cabinet, Struycken assumed her portfolio, including responsibility for the prison system. On 22 August 2025, Struycken resigned alongside the other NSC-appointed ministers and state secretaries due to a cabinet crisis concerning the Netherlands’ position on Israel.

== Personal life ==
His father was a professor in private international law at Radboud University Nijmegen, and his grandfather, Teun Struycken (1906–1977), served as interior and justice minister in the 1950s and 1960s for the Catholic People's Party (KVP).

Political offices
Preceded by Franc Weerwind as Minister for Legal Protection	State Secretary for Legal Protection; 2024–2025	Succeeded by Arno Rutte
