= Hendrik Constantijn Cras =

Dutch jurist and city librarian of Amsterdam

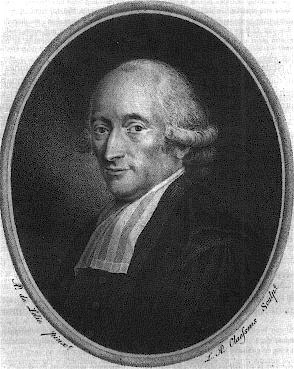
Hendrik Constantijn Cras

Hendrik Constantijn Cras (4 January 1739, Leiden – 5 April 1820, Amsterdam) was a Dutch jurist and city librarian of Amsterdam.

He studied law in Leiden. For nearly fifty years, beginning in 1771, he taught all fields of legal study at the Athenaeum Illustre in Amsterdam. His work mirrors the decline of the significance of Roman law in legal practice. Beginning his career as an adherent of Roman law, Cras became a fundamental supporter of natural law and legal codification towards the end of the 18th century. Noted for his focus on general principles of law, his lengthy publications on the principles of equality and liberty had nonetheless little lasting impact.

In 1798, Cras rose to prominence as the leading member of a commission charged with drafting national codes of law. The draft codes, published in 1804, appeared overly dogmatic and as a result never became law.
