= Rudolph Cleveringa =

Dutch law professor (1894–1980)

Rudolph Pabus Cleveringa
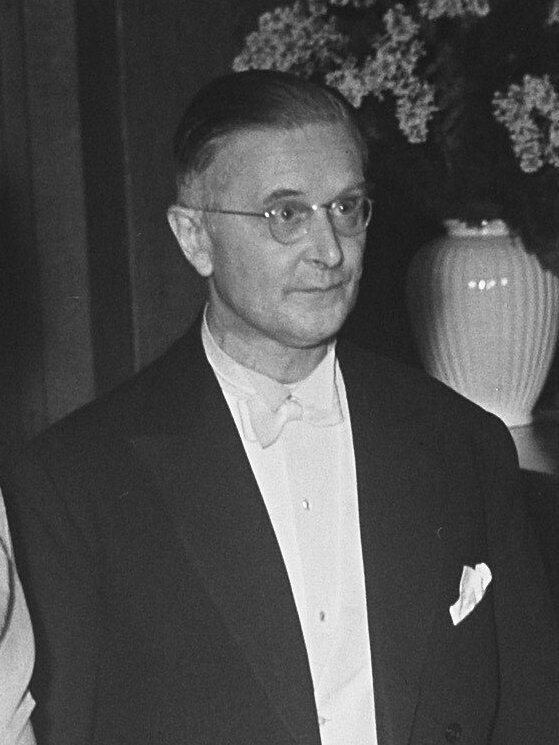
- Cleveringa in 1949
- Born: 2 April 1894; Appingedam, Netherlands
- Died: 15 December 1980 (aged 86); Oegstgeest, Netherlands
- Education: Leiden University
- Scientific career
- Fields: Private law
- Workplaces: Leiden University
- Thesis: De zakelijke werking van de ontbindende voorwaarde (1919)
- Doctoral advisor: Eduard Meijers

Rudolph Pabus Cleveringa (2 April 1894, Appingedam, Netherlands – 15 December 1980, Oegstgeest, Netherlands) was a Dutch professor of law at Leiden University. He is known for his speech of 26 November 1940, in which he protested against the dismissal of Jewish colleagues ordered by the German occupation authorities.

== Youth and education ==
Cleveringa was born in Appingedam. When he was four, his family moved to Heerenveen. Cleveringa received his secondary education in Leeuwarden, and studied with van Kleffens at Leiden University. In June 1917, he completed his doctoral studies and, in 1919, he obtained his PhD cum laude. His thesis, emphasizing legal history aspects, was titled De zakelijke werking van de ontbindende voorwaarde ('The in rem Effect of the Escape Clause').

== Work and resistance ==
After a brief stint at the court of Alkmaar in 1927 he was appointed Professor of Commercial Law and Civil Law at Leiden University. There, on November 26, 1940, in his capacity as Dean of the Faculty of Law, he delivered his famous speech in which he protested against the resignation, forced by the German occupation authorities, of his mentor, promoter and colleague Professor Eduard Maurits Meijers, and other Jewish professors. He deliberately abstained from any political arguments and did not comment on Meijers's Jewish background, but emphasized his scientific merits. The hall was full and the speech was broadcast over loudspeakers outside.

That same evening a group of students, led by André Koch of The Hague, made copies of the speech and disseminated them to other universities. Cleveringa and his wife were aware of the risk he was taking, and he had already put his packed suitcase in the hallway at home. The next day, Cleveringa was arrested and imprisoned until the summer of 1941 in the prison of Scheveningen, used for members of the Dutch resistance and nicknamed the "Orange Hotel". The Leiden students decided to strike and then the university was closed, only resuming operation after the war. In 1944, Cleveringa was imprisoned in Camp Vught, where he joined the College van Vertrouwensmannen ('College of Trusted Men') that coordinated the Dutch resistance.

== After the war ==
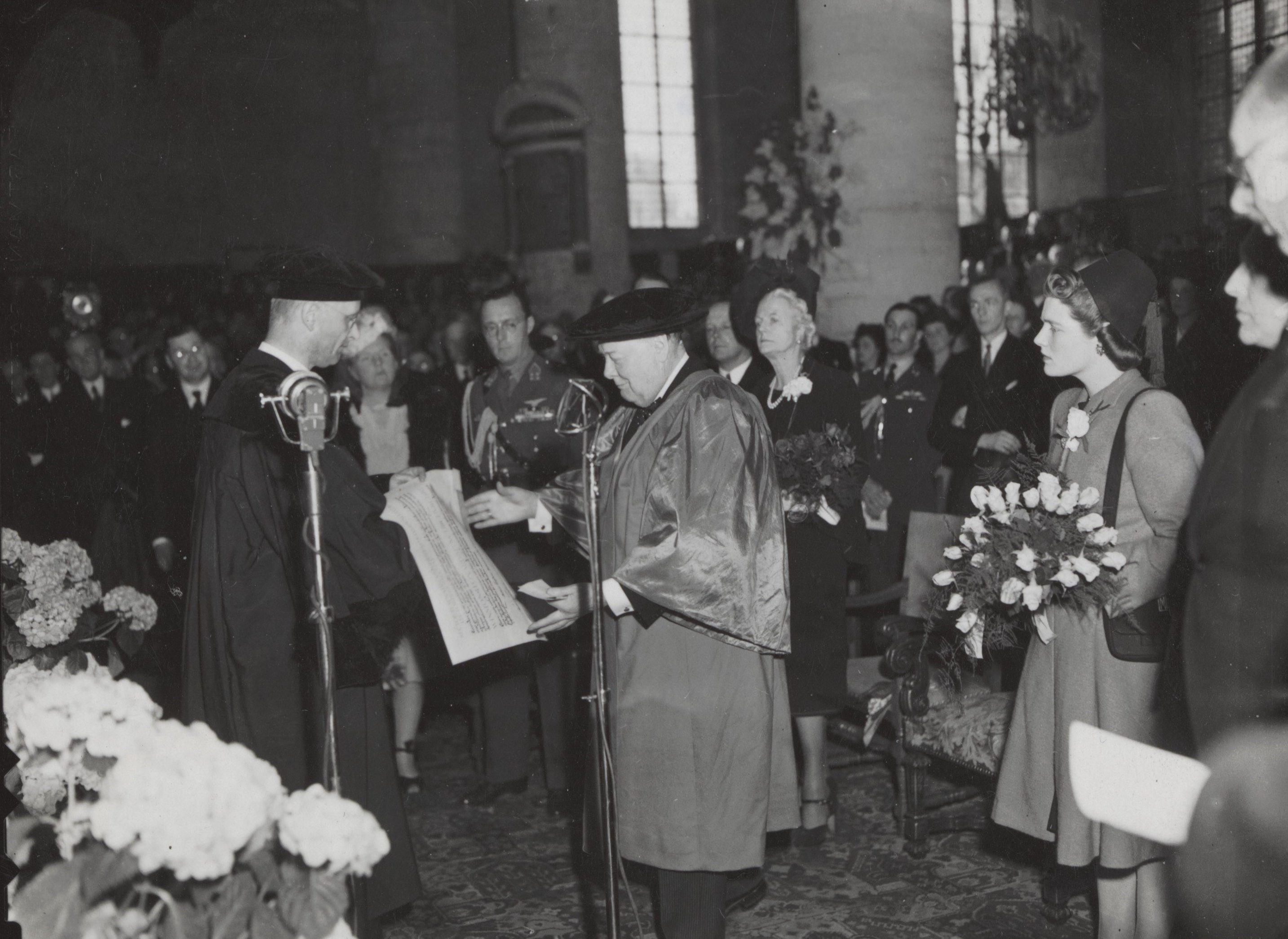
Honorary representative to Winston Churchill at the Pieterskerk, Leiden (1946)

Cleveringa, like Meijers, returned as a professor at Leiden University, which was reopened in September 1945. In 1946 he acted as honorary representative to Sir Winston Churchill in Leiden. The same year he became member of the Royal Netherlands Academy of Arts and Sciences. On 8 April 1953, the American government awarded Cleveringa the Medal of Freedom for his resistance work. In 1958 he retired from the university but joined the Council of State and served until 1963, when he was named Councillor of State extraordinary.

== Posthumously ==
Leiden University established the Cleveringa chair, occupied each year for one year by the appointed Cleveringa professor, who holds the annual Cleveringa lecture around 26 November. Each year Leiden University funds Cleveringa Lectures held on or about November 26 at many places in the world.

In 2004 Cleveringa was voted "Greatest person from Leiden University" by the readers of Mare, the Leiden University magazine.

His famous speech was named best speech of the Netherlands in 2015.
