= Dries van Agt =

Prime Minister of the Netherlands from 1977 to 1982

His Excellency Dries van Agt
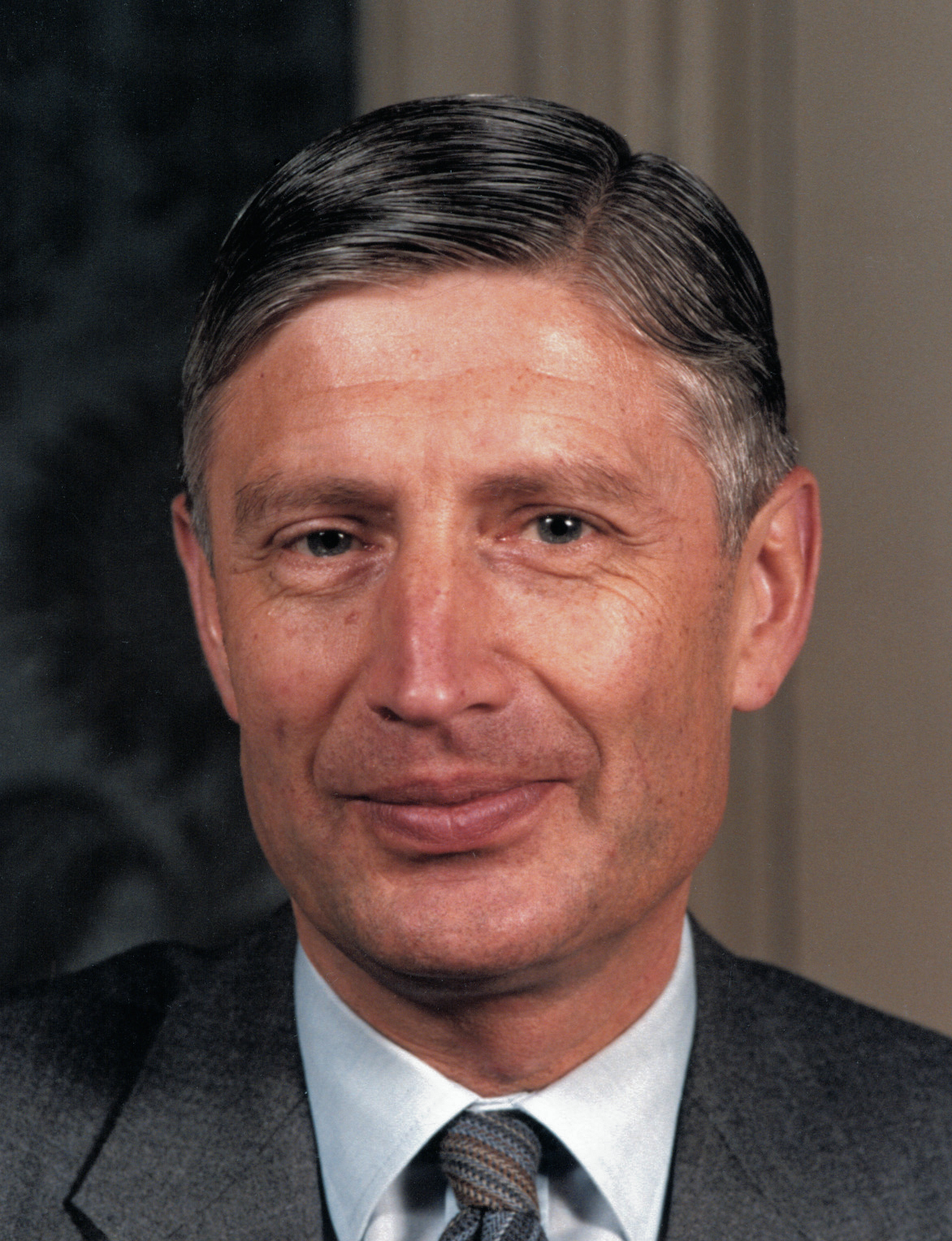
- Official portrait, 1980

Prime Minister of the Netherlands
- In office 19 December 1977 – 4 November 1982
- Monarchs: Juliana; Beatrix
- Deputy: See list: Hans Wiegel (1977–1981) Joop den Uyl (1981–1982) Jan Terlouw (1981–1982)
- Preceded by: Joop den Uyl
- Succeeded by: Ruud Lubbers

Ambassador of the European Union to the United States
- In office 1 January 1990 – 1 April 1995
- Preceded by: Roy Denman
- Succeeded by: Hugo Paemen

Ambassador of the European Union to Japan
- In office 1 January 1987 – 1 January 1990
- Preceded by: Laurens Jan Brinkhorst
- Succeeded by: Jean-Pierre Leng

Queen's Commissioner of North Brabant
- In office 1 June 1983 – 22 April 1987
- Monarch: Beatrix
- Preceded by: Jan Dirk van der Harten
- Succeeded by: Frank Houben

Minister of Foreign Affairs
- In office 28 May 1982 – 4 November 1982
- Prime Minister: Himself
- Preceded by: Max van der Stoel
- Succeeded by: Hans van den Broek

Parliamentary leader in the House of Representatives
- In office 10 June 1981 – 24 August 1981
- Preceded by: Ruud Lubbers
- Succeeded by: Ruud Lubbers
- In office 8 June 1977 – 19 December 1977
- Preceded by: Office established
- Succeeded by: Willem Aantjes
- Parliamentary group: Christian Democratic Appeal

Leader of the Christian Democratic Appeal
- In office 10 December 1976 – 25 October 1982
- Preceded by: Office established
- Succeeded by: Ruud Lubbers

Deputy Prime Minister
- In office 11 May 1973 – 8 September 1977
- Prime Minister: Joop den Uyl
- Preceded by: Roelof Nelissen; Molly Geertsema
- Succeeded by: Gaius de Gaay Fortman

Member of the House of Representatives
- In office 16 September 1982 – 16 June 1983
- In office 10 June 1981 – 9 September 1981
- In office 8 June 1977 – 19 December 1977
- In office 23 January 1973 – 22 April 1973

Minister of Justice
- In office 6 July 1971 – 8 September 1977
- Prime Minister: Barend Biesheuvel; Joop den Uyl
- Preceded by: Carel Polak
- Succeeded by: Gaius de Gaay Fortman

Personal details
- Born: Andreas Antonius Maria van Agt; 2 February 1931 Geldrop, Netherlands
- Died: 5 February 2024 (aged 93) Nijmegen, Netherlands
- Cause of death: Assisted suicide
- Party: Christian Democratic Appeal (1980–2021)
- Other political affiliations: Catholic People's Party (until 1980)
- Spouse: Eugenie Krekelberg
- Children: 3
- Education: Radboud University Nijmegen (LL.B., LL.M.)
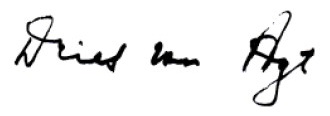
- Signature

Andreas Antonius Maria "Dries" van Agt (Dutch: [ˈdris fɑn ˈɑxt]; (Note: van in isolation: [vɑn].) 2 February 1931 – 5 February 2024) was a Dutch politician, jurist and diplomat who served as Prime Minister of the Netherlands from 19 December 1977 until 4 November 1982. He was a prominent leader of the Catholic People's Party (KVP) and later of its successor party, the Christian Democratic Appeal (CDA).

Van Agt was known for his abilities as a skilled debater and negotiator. During his premiership, his cabinets were responsible for several major public sector and civil service reforms and further reducing the deficit following the recession in the 1980s. Van Agt continued to comment on political affairs as a statesman until he suffered a major stroke in May 2019 that forced him to undergo rehabilitation. He held the distinction as the eldest living and earliest-serving former prime minister following the death of Piet de Jong in July 2016, until his death by assisted suicide in February 2024.

== Early life ==
Van Agt was born and grew up in Geldrop. He was the son of textile manufacturer Frans van Agt (1899–1974) and Anna Frencken (1902–1978), and was the eldest of five children. He was a great-great-grandson of Godefridus Marcelis Frencken, who served as mayor of Asten from 1843 to 1904.

=== Education ===
He attended gymnasium-A at the Augustinianum in Eindhoven from 1943 to 1949, where his future fellow minister Hans Gruijters was a classmate of his. He subsequently studied law at the Catholic University of Nijmegen. He graduated cum laude with his master of laws in June 1955, specialising in private law.

For the first two years of his studies, Van Agt was not active within the N.S.V. Carolus Magnus (N.S.C.) following a 'terrible' hazing. In the academic year 1951–1952, Van Agt was the first abactis to serve on the board of the senate of the N.S.C., under the leadership of the later KVP chairman and minister Fons van der Stee as preses. His fellow student Eugenie Krekelberg was second abactis, to whom Van Agt became engaged as early as 1951. In the academic year 1952–1953, he was himself preses of the senate. As preses, he reformed the hazing practices of the association and opened a 'meeting centre' for boys and girls.

=== Legal and academic career (1955–1971) ===
Due to varicose veins, Van Agt avoided military service. From 1956 to 1958 he worked as a lawyer in Eindhoven. He then worked until 1963 at the Directorate of Legal and Business Organisational Affairs of the Ministry of Agriculture, Fisheries and Food Supply, and until 1968 at the public law legislation department of the Ministry of Justice. After a brief period as a research associate, he was professor of criminal law and criminal procedure law at the Catholic University of Nijmegen from 1968 to 1971. Upon his departure, he was known according to de Gelderlander as a capable, tolerant and progressive jurist.

== Political career ==
=== Minister and deputy prime minister ===
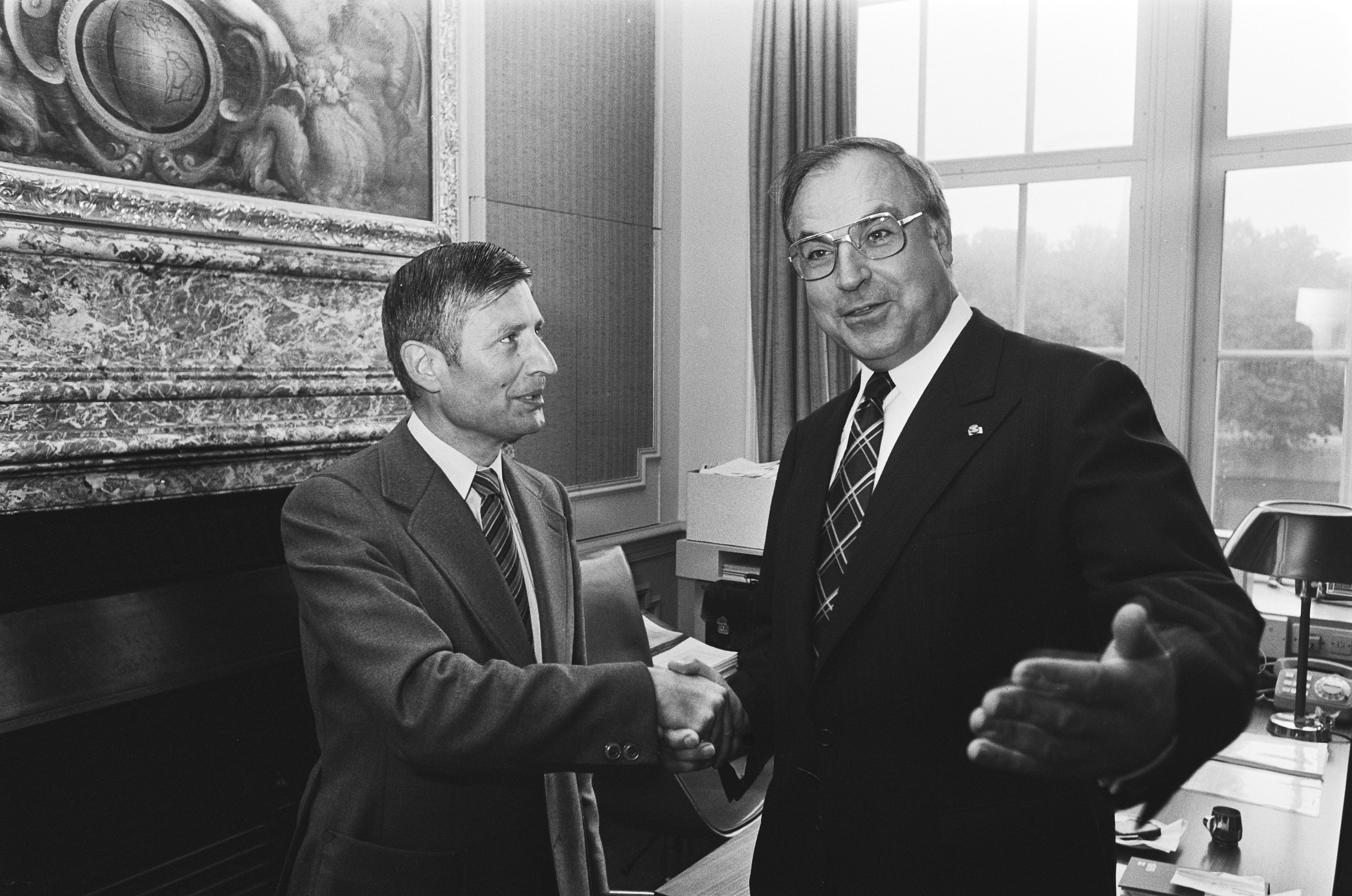
Prime Minister Dries van Agt and Leader of the West German CDU party Helmut Kohl at the Ministry of General Affairs on 13 September 1978

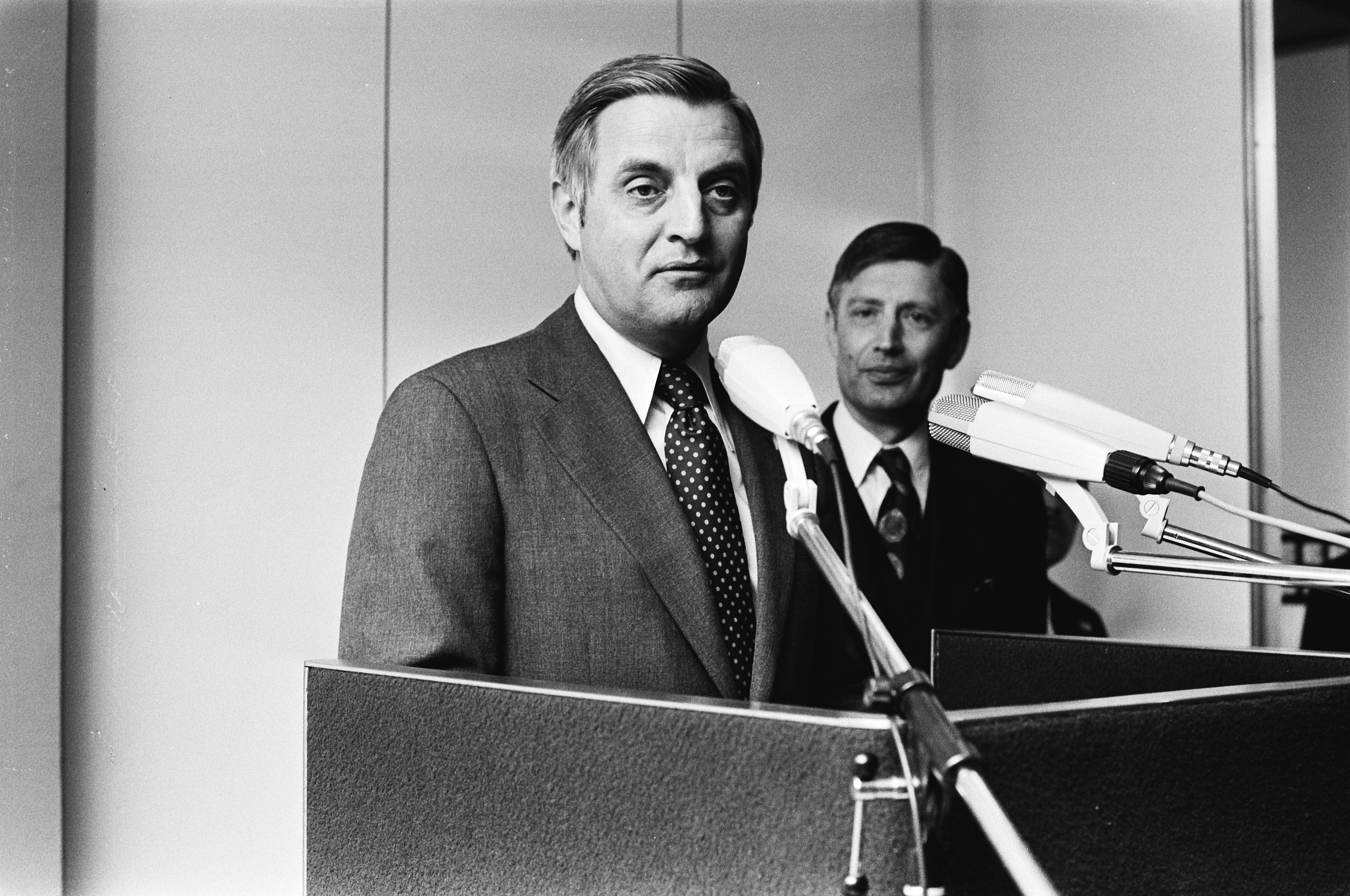
Vice President of the United States Walter Mondale and Prime Minister Dries van Agt during a press conference at Schiphol Airport on 21 April 1979

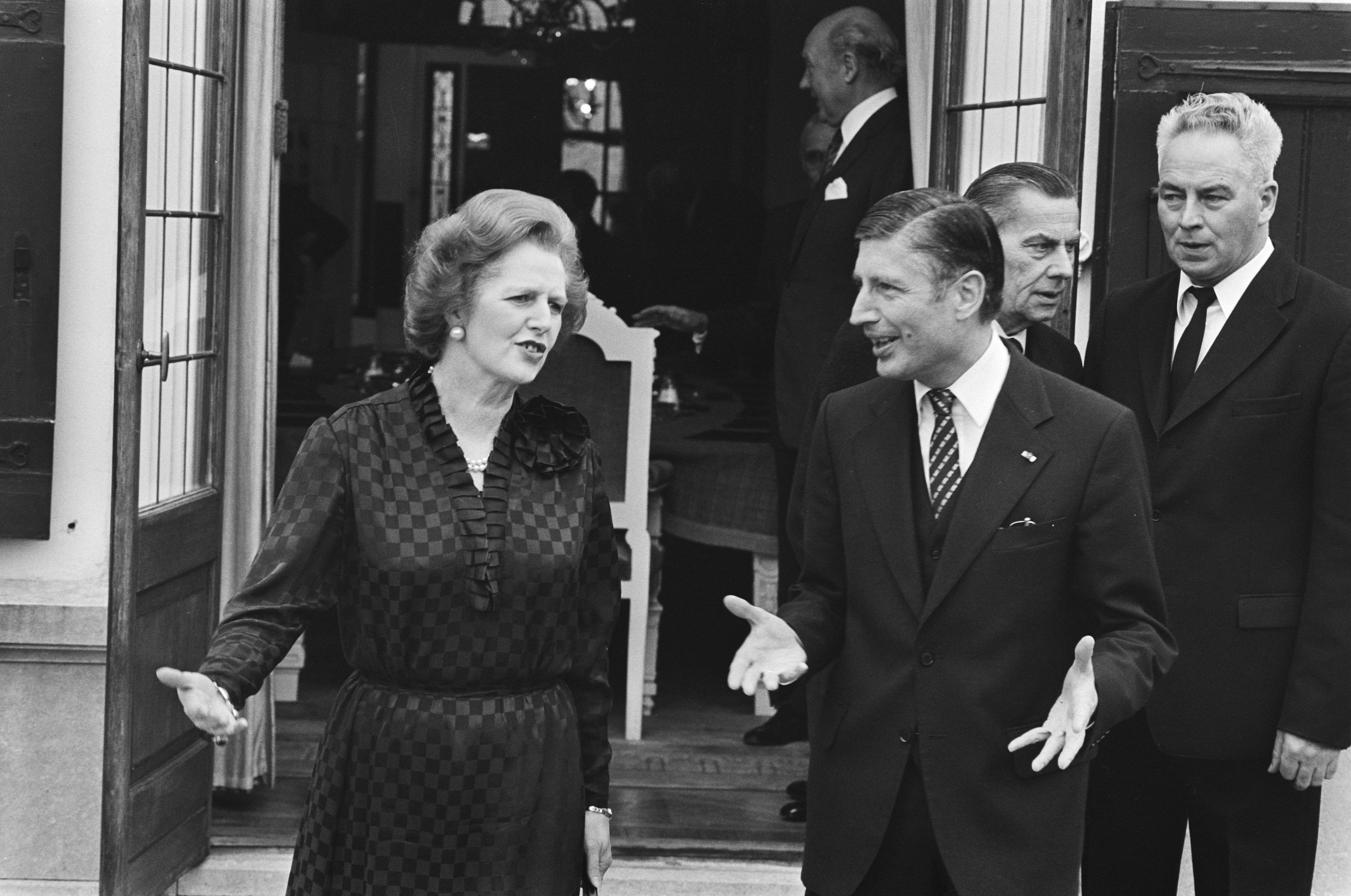
Prime Minister of the United Kingdom Margaret Thatcher and Prime Minister Dries van Agt at the Catshuis on 6 February 1981

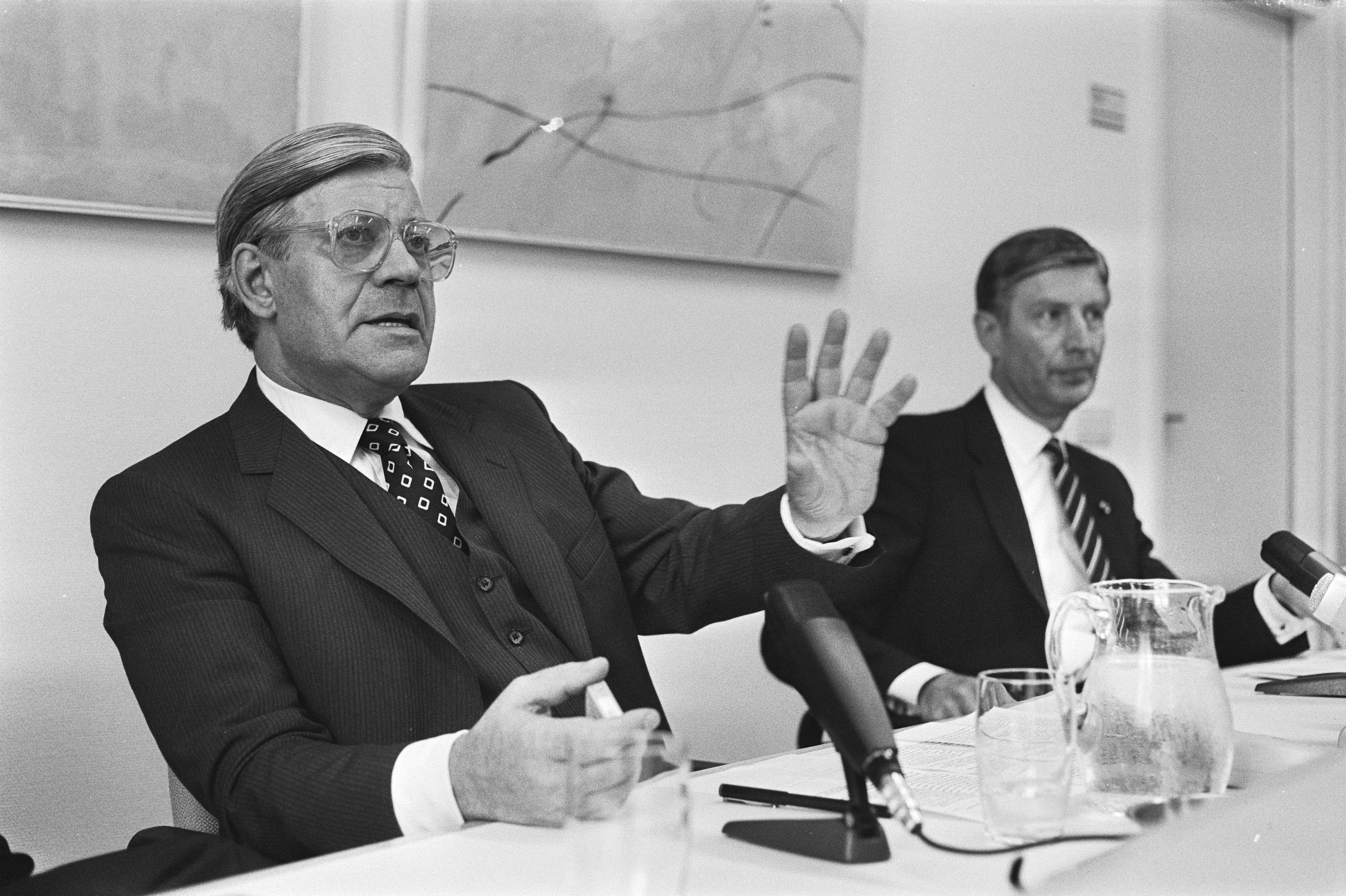
Chancellor of West Germany Helmut Schmidt and Prime Minister Dries van Agt during a press conference at Schiphol Airport on 9 July 1982

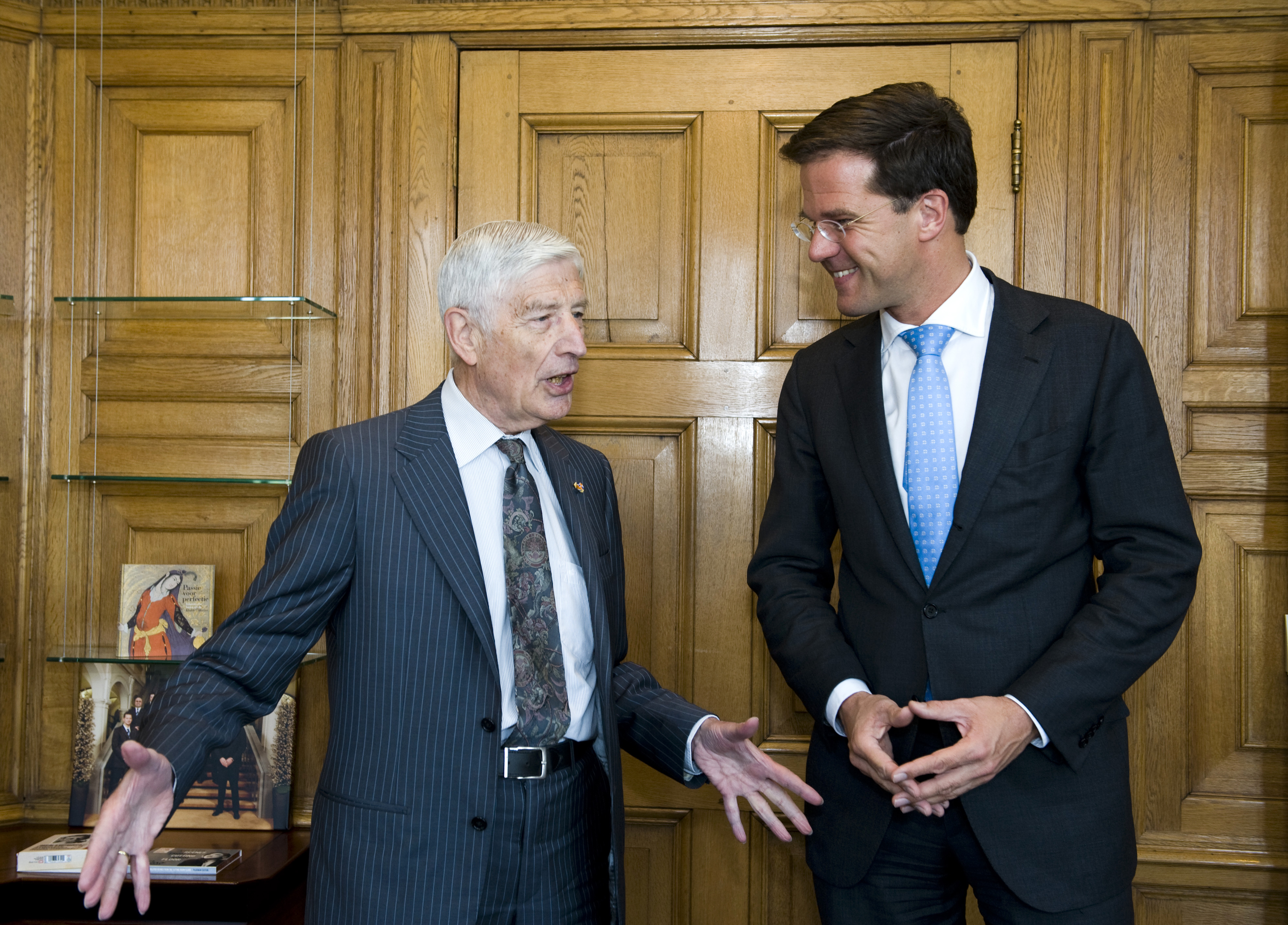
Dries van Agt and Prime Minister Mark Rutte in Het Torentje on 18 April 2011

Van Agt entered politics as a member of the Catholic People's Party, which merged with the other two major Christian democratic parties in 1980 to form the Christian Democratic Appeal (CDA). From 1968 to 1971, Van Agt was Professor of Criminal Law at the Catholic University of Nijmegen. From 1971 to 1973, he served as Minister of Justice in the first and second Biesheuvel cabinets. He caused outrage when he tried to pardon the last three Nazi war criminals still in Dutch prisons (known as the Breda Four) in 1972. From 1973 to 1977, he served as Deputy Prime Minister and Minister of Justice in the Den Uyl cabinet.

=== Leader of the Christian Democratic Appeal ===
In 1976, Van Agt was elected the first Leader of the Christian Democratic Appeal, then still a federation of the three confessional parties: the Christian Historical Union, the Catholic People's Party and the Anti-Revolutionary Party, which contested with a united list for the first time in the 1977 general election (the merger followed in 1980). With Van Agt as its lead candidate, the Christian Democratic Appeal reversed years of decline in 1977 and returned to power.

=== Prime minister in the Van Agt I cabinet ===
In the parliamentary election of May 1977, the Labour Party (PvdA) obtained its largest number of seats, so a second Den Uyl cabinet seemed likely. However, the tension between the Catholic People's Party and the Labour Party in the last coalition, combined with the fact that a coalition between the Christian Democratic Appeal and the People's Party for Freedom and Democracy (VVD) was possible, the talks failed after a period of seven months. Eventually Van Agt negotiated a deal with VVD leader Hans Wiegel. From 19 December 1977 to 11 September 1981, Van Agt served as Prime Minister of the Netherlands and Minister of General Affairs in the Van Agt I cabinet.

=== Prime minister in the Van Agt II cabinet ===
In 1981 general election, the CDA and the VVD both lost parliamentary seats, so a continuation of the CDA–VVD coalition was not possible, and Van Agt was forced to enter into a coalition with the Labour Party and the Democrats 66 (which, under Jan Terlouw, had gained a significant number of seats). Three months of difficult negotiations resulted in the Van Agt II cabinet (11 September 1981 – 29 May 1982). In this composition, Van Agt worked with Joop den Uyl again as Den Uyl was made Deputy Prime Minister and "super minister" of Social Affairs and Employment. The characterological and political differences led to several divisions, and in May 1982 the government fell.

The personal strife between Van Agt and Den Uyl had deteriorated to such an extent that when Den Uyl died from a brain tumor in 1987, Van Agt was not invited to the memorial service by the family. Den Uyl's wife Liesbeth argued that Van Agt had prevented the second Den Uyl cabinet from forming in 1977.

=== Prime minister in the Van Agt III cabinet ===
The caretaker government continued as a minority cabinet, with only ministers from the parties Christian Democratic Appeal and Democrats 66, in the Van Agt III cabinet. For replacing the six Labour Party ministers, five new Christian Democratic Appeal and Democrats 66 ministers were appointed, while Van Agt, in addition to being prime minister, took the position of Minister of Foreign Affairs upon him.

A new parliamentary election was planned for September 1982. Although Van Agt by this point was worn out, he was persuaded to lead his party's list again, but shortly after the election he withdrew as a candidate for prime minister and was succeeded by Ruud Lubbers.

== After politics ==
=== Diplomat ===
Dries van Agt served as Ambassador of the European Community to Japan from 1987 to 1990 and to the United States from 1990 to 1995. From 1995 to 1996, he was a visiting professor of International Relations at the University of Kyoto.

=== Professor ===
Until his death, Van Agt was Prime Counsellor for the International Forum for Justice and Peace, a foundation under Dutch law, registered at the Chamber of Commerce in Amsterdam. Chaired by retired international businessman Ben Smoes, they are currently focused on justice and peace regarding the Israeli–Palestinian conflict.

=== Activism ===
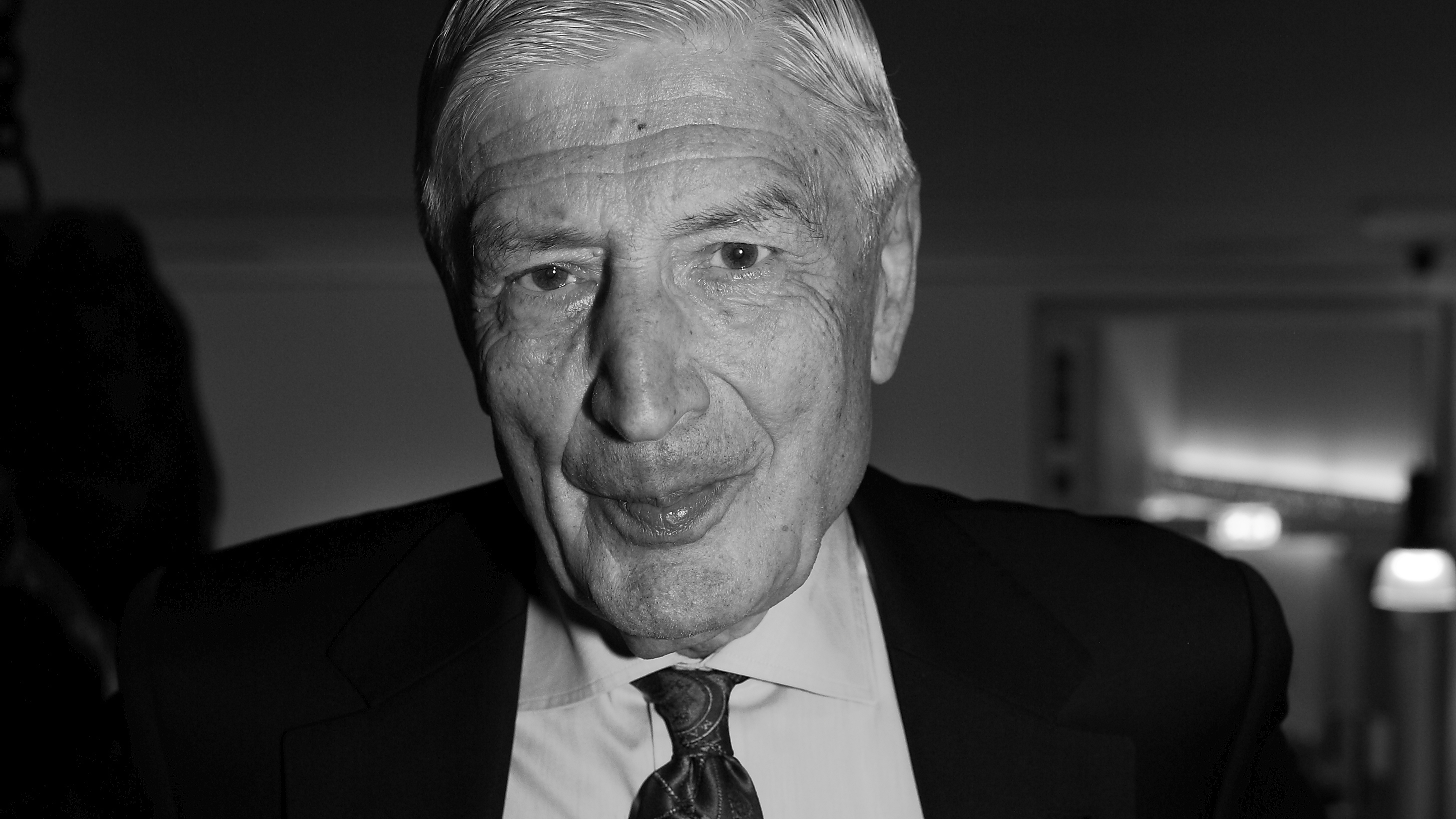
Dries van Agt, September 2010, Amsterdam

Van Agt lectured in Cairo in May 2006 at the invitation of the Egyptian electronic magazine Arab-West Report about great changes in the cultural climate of north-western Europe in the past decades, becoming more hostile to religion, including Islam. Muslims, he argued, need to understand those changes to be able to respond better to European criticism of Islam and the Muslim world.

Van Agt also spoke against the Council of State in Egypt for continuous delay in granting the Center for Arab-West Understanding (CAWU) the NGO status. He met with prominent figures in Egypt to persuade them to do so. The Egyptian Council of State, after van Agt's visit to Cairo in 2006, ruled on 18 February 2007 that the center should be recognized as an NGO under Egyptian law, ending its three-year struggle to obtain this status. Egypt is known for its reluctance in granting NGO status to discourage political participation. Cornelis Hulsman, a Dutch sociologist, the editor-in-chief of Arab-West Report, and the head of CAWU, stated that van Agt's effort significantly impacted the realization of their goals, which usually requires a lengthy amount of time and scrutiny in its political purposes.

For some years, Van Agt took an outspoken stance regarding the Middle East, resulting in a fierce criticism of the policies undertaken by the government of Israel with regard to the Palestinians. When in office, Van Agt had been a staunch supporter of Israel, but after he stepped down in 1982, he changed his mind. According to his own words an important turning point was a visit at the late nineties at Bethlehem University on the Israeli-occupied West Bank. He accused Israel of "state terrorism" and turning the Palestinian Authority territories into "bantustans".

In 2009, Van Agt founded The Rights Forum, a non-profit organization aimed at promoting a “just and sustainable Dutch and European policy regarding the Palestine/Israel issue”. In 2012, he said that Jews should have had a state in Germany instead of Israel. In September 2016, in reference to the visit of Prime Minister of Israel Benjamin Netanyahu to the Netherlands, Van Agt argued that the ongoing Israeli occupation of the Palestinian territories and the building of settlements there constituted a war crime under the Rome Statute and suggested that Netanyahu should have been sent to the International Criminal Court.

== Personal life and death ==
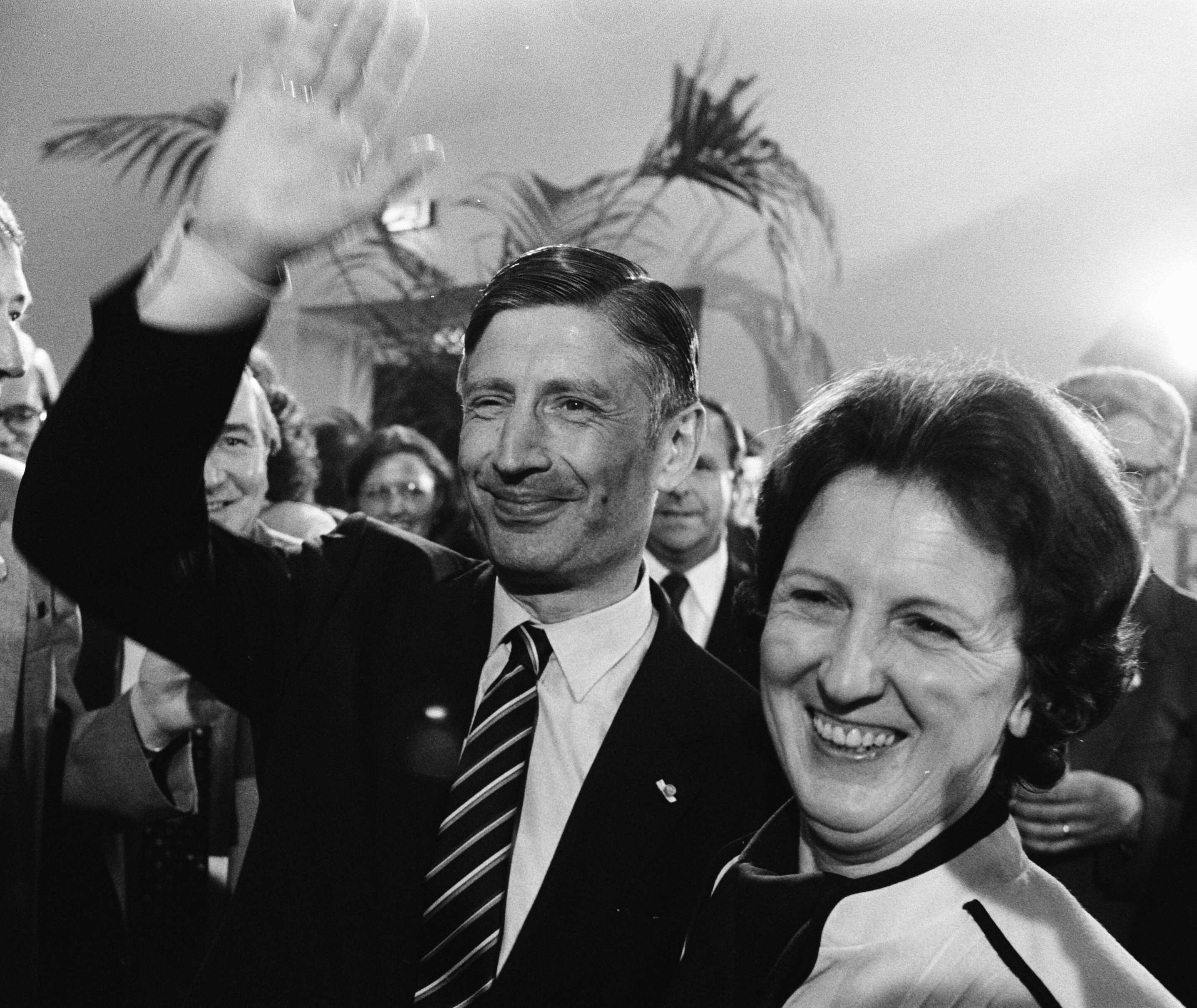
The Van Agts in 1981

Van Agt was known for his use of archaic language and complicated phrasing, as well as for his love for cycling. He married Eugenie Krekelberg in 1958, and they had three children and seven grandchildren, including professional cyclist Eva van Agt. In 2012, he joined the advisory board of the International Museum for Family History. Van Agt lived in Heilig Landstichting, near Nijmegen, until his death.

Van Agt and his wife, after choosing euthanasia, died on 5 February 2024, three days after his 93rd birthday. According to family, the couple died holding hands. Van Agt had previously suffered a debilitating brain hemorrhage while giving a speech in 2019.

== Decorations ==
=== Honours ===
Honours
Ribbon bar	Honour	Country	Date
	Honorary Medal for Initiative and Ingenuity of the Order of the House of Orange	Netherlands	19 September 1974
	Knight Grand Cross of the Order of Orange-Nassau	Netherlands	9 December 1982

=== Awards ===
Awards
Ribbon bar	Award	Country	Date
	Honorary citizen of Geldrop	Netherlands	1988
	Honorary citizen of Lille	France	1998
	Honorary citizen of North Brabant	Netherlands	2002
	Cannabis Culture Award of the Hash, Marihuana & Hemp Museum	Netherlands	12 November 2009

=== Honorary degrees ===
Honorary degrees
University	Field	Country	Date
Radboud University Nijmegen	Law	Netherlands	
Ritsumeikan University	Political science	Japan	
Kwansei Gakuin University	Political science	Japan	
Hansung University	Law	South Korea	
University of South Carolina	Political science	United States	

== Sources ==
- Van Merriënboer, Johan; Bootsma, Peter; Van Griensven, Peter (2008). Van Agt Biografie. Tour de Force (in Dutch) (ebook ed.). Amsterdam: Boom. ISBN 978-94-6127-309-3.

Party political offices
New political party	Leader of the Christian Democratic Appeal; 1976–1982	Succeeded by Ruud Lubbers
New political party	Parliamentary leader of the Christian Democratic Appeal in the House of Representatives; 1977	Succeeded by Willem Aantjes
Preceded by Ruud Lubbers	Parliamentary leader of the Christian Democratic Appeal in the House of Representatives; 1981	Succeeded by Ruud Lubbers
Political offices
Preceded by Carel Polak	Minister of Justice; 1971–1977	Succeeded by Gaius de Gaay Fortman
Preceded by Roelof Nelissen; Molly Geertsema	Deputy Prime Minister; 1973–1977	Succeeded by Gaius de Gaay Fortman
Preceded by Joop den Uyl	Prime Minister of the Netherlands; Minister of General Affairs; 1977–1982	Succeeded by Ruud Lubbers
Preceded by Max van der Stoel	Minister of Foreign Affairs; 1982	Succeeded by Hans van den Broek
Preceded by Jan Dirk van der Harten	Queen's Commissioner of North Brabant; 1983–1987	Succeeded by Frank Houben
Diplomatic posts
Preceded by Laurens Jan Brinkhorst	Ambassador of the European Union to Japan; 1987–1990	Succeeded by Jean-Pierre Leng
Preceded by Roy Denman	Ambassador of the European Union to the United States; 1990–1995	Succeeded by Hugo Paemen
Records
Preceded by Piet de Jong	Oldest living former Dutch Prime Minister; 2016–2024	Succeeded by Jan Peter Balkenende
