= List of King's and Queen's commissioners of North Brabant =

This article is a list of King's and Queen's commissioners of the province of North Brabant, Netherlands.

== List of King's and Queen's commissioners of North Brabant ==
For full list, see List of King's and Queen's commissioners of North Brabant (in Dutch).

Portrait	Name (born and died)	Term	Party	Monarch
Jan de Quay	Jan de Quay (1901–1985)	1 November 1946 – 19 May 1959 (12 years, 199 days)^{[Appt]}	Catholic; People's Party	Wilhelmina (1890–1948)
Jan de Quay	Jan de Quay (1901–1985)	1 November 1946 – 19 May 1959 (12 years, 199 days)^{[Appt]}	Catholic; People's Party	Juliana (1948–1980)
Constant Kortmann	Constant Kortmann (1908–1997)	1 October 1959 – 1 August 1973 (13 years, 304 days)	Catholic; People's Party	Juliana (1948–1980)
Gerrit Brokx	Gerrit Brokx (1933–2002)	1 August 1973 – 1 December 1973 (122 days)^{[Ad Interim]}	Catholic; People's Party	Juliana (1948–1980)
Jan Dirk van der Harten	Jan Dirk van der Harten (1918–1998)	1 December 1973 – 1 June 1983 (9 years, 182 days)	Catholic; People's Party (1973–1980)	Juliana (1948–1980)
Jan Dirk van der Harten	Jan Dirk van der Harten (1918–1998)	1 December 1973 – 1 June 1983 (9 years, 182 days)	Christian; Democratic Appeal (1980–198)	Beatrix (1980–2013)
Dries van Agt	Dries van Agt (1931–2024)	1 June 1983 – 22 April 1987 (3 years, 325 days)^{[Res]}	Christian; Democratic Appeal	Beatrix (1980–2013)
Frank Houben	Frank Houben (1939–2023)	22 April 1987 – 1 October 2003 (16 years, 162 days)	Christian; Democratic Appeal	Beatrix (1980–2013)
Hanja Maij-Weggen	Hanja Maij-Weggen (born 1943)	1 October 2003 – 1 October 2009 (6 years, 0 days)	Christian; Democratic Appeal	Beatrix (1980–2013)
Wim van de Donk	Wim van de Donk (born 1962)	1 October 2009 – 1 October 2020 (11 years, 0 days)	Christian; Democratic Appeal	Beatrix (1980–2013)
Wim van de Donk	Wim van de Donk (born 1962)	1 October 2009 – 1 October 2020 (11 years, 0 days)	Christian; Democratic Appeal	Willem-Alexander (2013–present)
Ina Adema	Ina Adema (born 1968)	1 October 2020 – Incumbent (5 years, 112 days)	People's Party for Freedom and Democracy	Willem-Alexander (2013–present)

^{Resigned}
^{Ad Interim}
^{Resigned after appointment Prime Minister}

== See also ==
- King's commissioner
- North Brabant
