= Electronic Network for Arab-West Understanding =

The Electronic Network for Arab-West Understanding (ENAWU) is a specialized information network that links together a network of think-tanks and information repositories in the West and the Arab world.

== Background of ENAWU ==
The establishment of this network was funded by the Anna Lindh Foundation, the German development organization Misereor, and others.

The network was launched on June 5, 2008, by Prince Hassan bin Talal in Jordan, with project directors Cornelis Hulsman and Sawsan Gabra Ayoub Khalil.

== The Objective of ENAWU ==
ENAWU aims to foster relations and dialogue between Muslims and non-Muslims by providing access to accurate, credible, and reliable information for use by scholars, diplomats, journalists, students, other researchers and general users. Improving public understanding of the contemporary Islamic world in non-Muslim countries and, similarly, improving public understanding of the contemporary non-Muslim world in Islamic countries can be accomplished by strengthening, improving and expanding reporting. Reporting that will necessarily include analysis of Arab-West cultural issues, religious issues, and other key factors that involve civil society in the Arab world and the West. ENAWU aims at changing the ways in which sensitive topics involving people belonging to other cultures or religions are discussed, stressing the need to refrain from polemics, exaggerations, and other forms of distortion. The ENAWU portal uses the Arab-West Report as a springboard for discussions, recently encouraging interactive online forum discussions on the controversial film 'Fitna' by Dutch MP Geert Wilders.

== History ==
Dutch sociologist Cornelis Hulsman moved with his Egyptian wife Sawsan Gabra Ayoub Khalil in 1994 to Egypt where they discovered large discrepancies between various (Western) media reporting and what they actually found in Egypt after thorough investigations of various topics reported in media. It became clear that many of the complexities in society and context were insufficiently explained for audiences that generally have little knowledge about Egyptian society. This made Cornelis Hulsman initiate the Religious News Service from the Arab World in 1997. In 2003 the name was changed to Arab-West Report. The data include summary translations from Arabic media, investigative reporting, interviews with major actors. The focus was always non-partisan and never only on tensions or dialogue only. The aim was to give a full overview of the complexity of different convictions in Egyptian society. Arab-West Report was until 2005 the personal initiative of Cornelis Hulsman and Sawsan Gabra Ayoub Khalil.

The Center for Intercultural Dialogue and Translation (CIDT), an Egyptian not for profit company founded in 2005, the Arab-West Foundation in the Netherlands, an NGO founded in 2005 and the Center for Arab-West Understanding, an Egyptian NGO founded in 2007 were established to continue this work and work together on building and expanding the Arab-West Report electronic database with a thorough search system that provides readers with rapid insights into different ways of thinking and reporting from what most audiences are used to seeing. In 2007/2008, the Anna Lindh Foundation agreed to provide the necessary financial support that actualized the ENAWU project. Prior to that Arab-West Report was built without a standard platform and the databases of participating organizations were distributed on different platforms. In 2008, a portal was developed to link the web-based resources and archives belonging to 15 organizations. These were the organizations that had demonstrated commitment to aspects like intercultural, inter-faith, and dialogue-based activities. The essence of having the portal as searchable as possible was to make it easy for the specific users to access, retrieve, and share information which would be contributing to better understand issues as reported in contemporary media. Key to the ENAWU project was enhancing the search functions. CIDT developed an indexation system based on the Dewey classification system that university libraries worldwide use. Through this a user can search for topics and see how topics are related to each other. The purpose is showing users that reported items never stand on their own but must be understood in their wider context.

Through the ENAWU project CIDT standardized the transliteration of Arabic names. This was a major headache since none of the participating organizations used the same transliteration system for Arabic names. The participating organizations realized that standardization in one organization is already difficult but that across different organizations it is even more difficult.

The ENAWU project created a very elaborate tagging system to all data online, including names of authors, names of people and organizations mentioned in texts, references of authors to Bible and Qur’an, which helped organizations in Egypt to make a convincing argument against the film Fitna of Geert Wilders in March 2008. ENAWU used the Arab-West Report as a springboard for discussions, on the controversial film 'Fitna' by Dutch MP Geert Wilders[3] and a petition of Egyptian church and Muslim leaders to Dutch Parliament. This resulted in the formation of the Dutch Cairo Committee which consists of representatives of different Christian denominations, Muslim organizations. Later Dutch Jewish organizations joined. Again later the Committee changed its name in Overlegorgaan Joden, Christenen, Moslims (OJCM), Consultation Jews, Christians, Muslims.

ENAWU created a hierarchical system for location names (country, governorate, district and smallest administrative units) and linked this to articles in the Arab-West Report database. This makes the search system in particular useful to rapidly discover context to any issue that pops up in the media and thus rapidly quell conspiracy theories and other distortions.

The portal was developed to provide avenues and facilities for participation of all users. The individual registered users, registered organizations, and other casual visitors could readily search, collaborate and communicate while using the portal. As mentioned above, the essence of developing the system in the manner noted was to enhance sharing and collaboration using the information. Having a database that had access to the various other electronically stored data was a significant step in realizing the objectives of ENAWU. As such, the portal developed was created to support the initial supportive organizations, as well as to scale and support a growing number of network partners, members, individuals associated and other entities. The development of the database went hand-in-hand with the development of student internships. Through the database in particular they became aware how complex many reported issues are that they we should refrain from making rapid judgements. Many students reported that realities in interfaith relations are far more complex than what they had read in books during their studies.

Thanks to the Electronic Network for Arab-West Understanding project it became much easier for students to build on the experiences and work of previous students. Students became increasingly important to add content to the database, promoted this through social media and other channels.

A key characteristic became the large variety in nationalities at any given point in time. Students love this mix between Egyptians and non-Egyptians of tens of different nationalities. Due to its advantage of enabling the interns to work and collaborate in a multicultural environment while contributing to the goals of ENAWU, the interns were exposed to real issues affecting the Middle East, and how they could help in the furtherance of ENAWU's objectives as well as similar initiatives from other stakeholders. Furthermore, the interns’ insights are noted to have played a pertinent role in the realization of the goals of the project.

The database has become a major tool for students and researchers. A substantial number of PhD researchers have used Arab-West Report for their theses. This shows the influence Arab-West Report has on scholarly work related to the role of convictions (religious and secular) in society. Many Muslim and non-Muslim organizations became increasingly interested in the improvement of knowledge-sharing and positive relations both in the West and the Arab world. Other users of the portal include businesspeople, civil society groups and policymakers.

Another part of the portal development was the newsletter. The newsletter was to cover topics that are central to Muslim Christianity relations in the Arab world, highlighting various student activities and would be used as a significant communication tool for ENAWU.

The ENAWU project provided the basis for the ZIVIK Peace Building project in 2010, funded by the Institut für Auslandsbeziehungen, Germany. The documents that were produced during the ZIVIK project (and later other projects) have all been added to the Arab-West Report database and are fully searchable.

The original aim was to collect data from different Arab countries and Europe to make this accessible in different languages, including English and Arabic. Financial restrictions made the three organizations concentrate on the Arab-West Report database that is now primarily focused on the role of religion in Egyptian society. In this way the Arab-West Report has become a major and effective hub for Muslim-Christian understanding in Egypt and an example of how this could be set up in other countries as well.

In 2010 it became necessary for CIDT, the leading partner in the ENAWU project, to have a rallying call. The mission statement, set of goals, and methods to be used were defined with support of Dutch consultancy bureau MDF and adopted and ratified into the Strategic Report of October 28, 2010. The mission statement became “a non-partisan organisation that contributes to the peaceful coexistence of religious groups in Egypt,” which has remained unchanged since then. The keywords are non-partisan, peaceful coexistence of religious groups and Egypt. CIDT is of opinion that country-based organizations should not try to be involved in other countries. For this reason, CIDT welcomes cooperation with similar minded organizations in other countries.

In 2013, catastrophe happened. As part of the political upheavals in Egypt that saw the ouster of President Morsi from power, the core databases of the portal were destroyed. The works on it were temporarily halted and the disaster was subsequently investigated by Dutch company Digital Investigation. The findings were that the attacks were deliberate, these were careful attempts to destroy the gains that the project had realized. The database has been rebuilt since then with precautions through daily back-ups that this cannot happen again.

Prof. Dr. Wolfram Reiss, head of the Department of Systematic Theology and the Study of Religions at the University of Vienna, gave Arab-West Report in 2012 a platform that would include substantial contributions of student interns which gave many of them a first opportunity to contribute to academic publishing. This resulted in three academic books (part of the series of Anwendungsorientierte Religionswissenschaften [application oriented religious studies] of Tectum Publishers in Germany) about the Egyptian revolution and its aftermath. The books offered new perspectives into the events and outcomes of the uprising. Practically all interviews could be recorded and have been fully transcribed for placement in Arab-West Report which is an important source of information on the complexities of the revolution and its aftermath. The forewords of the second and third book were written by ambassador Mona Omar and Amr Moussa in his capacity as former president of the Constituent Assembly of 2014.

Between January 2016 and January 2017, for one year, the Data Archiving and Networked Services (DANS) of the combined Dutch universities and affiliated research institutions helped transform the collected data into datasets. The datasets were then uploaded to the DANS database. The DANS database was crucial for widening the reach of the database, particularly to academic communities.

Arab-West Report became the basis for the 2018 Intercultural Summer School which was organized by the Center for Arab-West Understanding (CAWU) and Heliopolis University for Sustainable Development. In 2019 the Center for Arab-West Understanding organized a second Intercultural Summer School but this time in cooperation with the Anglican Diocese of Egypt, Al-Azhar Center for Interreligious Dialogue at the Azhar University and Ain Shams University. The summer schools attracted university students from Egypt, Tunisia, Europe and other parts of the world, including students of many different world-views which was intended since only such diversity and encounters can foster real dialogue.

== Appraisal ==
The database involves students worldwide NS gives students, Egyptian and non-Egyptian, an opportunity to learn about intercultural complexities and how to deal with this in an unprecedented way. The database is used by people worldwide and as Dr. Peter O’Brien, an Irish economist working with the EU noted, “Like many crucial problems of conflict and the search for understanding, issues of Arab/West Understanding suffer acutely from the NON SUSTAINABILITY OF MEMORY. Your work, especially the stock of material, makes a vital contribution to sustaining accurate memory. I believe this is not an academic comment, but a vital selling point.”

The database has been praised by prominent people as HRH Prince el-Hassan bin Talal of Jordan, Prof. Andreas van Agt, Prime Minister of the Netherlands, 1977–1082, Lord Dr. George Carey, Archbishop of Canterbury, 1991–2002, Dr. Hamdi Zaqzouq, Egyptian Minister of Endowments, 1995–2011, Amr Moussa, Egyptian Minister of Foreign Affairs, 1991–2001, Secretary General of the League of Arab States, 2001–2011, candidate in the Egyptian Presidential elections in 2012 and chairman of the Egyptian Constituent Assembly in 2013 and many others, including academics, human rights workers, journalists, representatives of NGOs, politicians, religious leaders and diplomats.
