= Annemarie Jorritsma =

Dutch politician

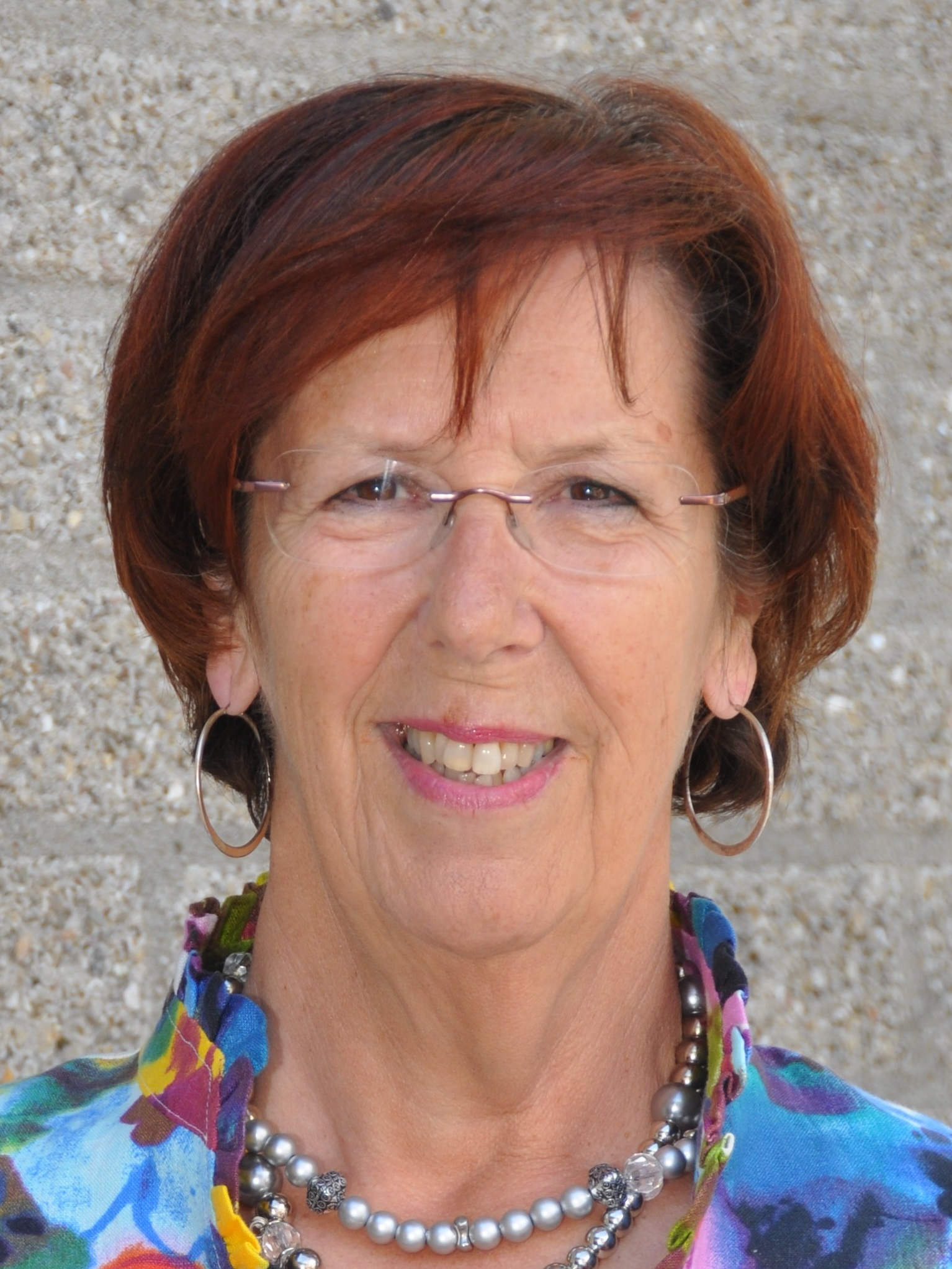
- Jorritsma in 2010

Parliamentary leader in the Senate
- In office 24 November 2015 – 4 July 2023
- Preceded by: Helmi Huijbregts-Schiedon
- Succeeded by: Edith Schippers
- Parliamentary group: People's Party for Freedom and Democracy

Member of the Senate
- In office 9 June 2015 – 4 July 2023
- Parliamentary group: People's Party for Freedom and Democracy

Mayor of Almere
- In office 16 August 2003 – 9 September 2015
- Preceded by: Hans Ouwerkerk (Ad interim)
- Succeeded by: Franc Weerwind

Mayor of Delfzijl
- In office 11 February 2003 – 16 August 2003; Acting
- Preceded by: Ed Haaksman
- Succeeded by: Henk van Hoof (Ad interim)

Deputy Prime Minister
- In office 3 August 1998 – 22 July 2002 Serving with Els Borst
- Prime Minister: Wim Kok
- Preceded by: Hans Dijkstal; Hans van Mierlo
- Succeeded by: Eduard Bomhoff; Johan Remkes

Minister of Economic Affairs
- In office 3 August 1998 – 22 July 2002
- Prime Minister: Wim Kok
- Preceded by: Hans Wijers
- Succeeded by: Herman Heinsbroek

Minister of Transport and Water Management
- In office 22 August 1994 – 3 August 1998
- Prime Minister: Wim Kok
- Preceded by: Koos Andriessen (Ad interim)
- Succeeded by: Tineke Netelenbos

Member of the House of Representatives
- In office 23 May 2002 – 30 January 2003
- In office 19 May 1998 – 3 August 1998
- In office 30 July 1986 – 22 August 1994
- In office 16 September 1982 – 3 June 1986
- Parliamentary group: People's Party for Freedom and Democracy

Personal details
- Born: Annemarie Lebbink; 1 June 1950 (age 76) Hengelo, Netherlands
- Party: People's Party for Freedom and Democracy (from 1973)
- Spouse: Gerlof Jorritsma (m. 1971)
- Children: 2 daughters
- Education: Baudartius College (Bachelor of Liberal Arts)
- Occupation: Politician · Civil servant · Businesswoman · Corporate director · Nonprofit director

Annemarie Jorritsma-Lebbink (born 1 June 1950) is a Dutch politician of the People's Party for Freedom and Democracy (VVD) and businesswoman. She is the Parliamentary leader in the Senate since 24 November 2015 and a Member of the Senate since 9 June 2015.

== Life and career ==
After graduating from the secondary school Baudartius College in Zutphen in 1967, Jorritsma attended the School for Tourist Training (School voor Toeristische Vorming) in Breda. She also followed a French teacher training course (which she did not complete) and various politically oriented courses.

Jorritsma served on the Municipal Council of Bolsward from 5 September 1978 until 1988. She was elected as a Member of the House of Representatives after the election of 1982, serving from 16 September 1982 until 3 June 1986. Jorritsma returned as a Member of the House of Representatives after Wim van Eekelen was appointed Minister of Defence in the Cabinet Lubbers II after the election of 1986, taking office on 30 July 1986 serving as a frontbencher and spokesperson for Spatial Planning. After the election of 1994 Jorritsma was appointed as Minister of Transport and Water Management in the Cabinet Kok I, taking office on 22 August 1994. After the election of 1998 Jorritsma returned as a Member of the House of Representatives, taking office on 19 May 1998. Following the cabinet formation of 1998 Jorritsma was appointment as Deputy Prime Minister and Minister of Economic Affairs in the Cabinet Kok II, taking office on 3 August 1998. The Cabinet Kok II resigned on 16 April 2002 following the conclusions of the NIOD report into the Srebrenica massacre during the Bosnian War and continued to serve in a demissionary capacity. After the election of 2002 Jorritsma again returned as a Member of the House of Representatives, taking office on 23 May 2002. Following the cabinet formation of 2002 Jorritsma was not giving a cabinet post in the new cabinet, the Cabinet Kok II was replaced by the Cabinet Balkenende I on 22 July 2002 and he continued to serve in the House of Representatives as a frontbencher and spokesperson for Social Affairs and Employment. In October 2002 Jorritsma announced that she wouldn't stand for the election of 2003 and continued to serve until the end of the parliamentary term on 30 January 2003.

Jorritsma remained in active in national politics, in February 2003 she was appointed as acting Mayor of Delfzijl, taking office on 11 February 2003. In August 2003 she was nominated as Mayor of Almere, she resigned as acting Mayor of Delfzijl the same day she was installed as Mayor of Almere, serving from 16 August 2003 until 9 September 2015. Jorritsma also became active in the private sector and public sector and occupied numerous seats as a corporate director and nonprofit director on several boards of directors and supervisory boards (PricewaterhouseCoopers, Equens, Alliander, Association of Participation Companies and Recruit Global Staffing). Jorritsma also served as chairwoman of the executive board of the Association of Municipalities from 1 May 2008 until 3 June 2015. Jorritsma was elected as a Member of the Senate after the Senate election of 2015, taking office on 9 June 2015 serving as a frontbencher and spokesperson for Infrastructure and Water Management. Jorritsma was selected as Parliamentary leader of the People's Party for Freedom and Democracy in the Senate following the resignation of Loek Hermans, taking office on 24 November 2015.

== Decorations ==
Honours
Ribbon bar	Honour	Country	Date	Comment
	Grand Officer of the Order of Leopold II	Belgium	10 December 1998	
	Knight Commander's Cross of the Order of Merit	Germany	20 October 2000	
	Commander of the Order of Orange-Nassau	Netherlands	3 June 2015	Promoted from Officer (10 December 2002)

Party political offices
Preceded by Helmi Huijbregts-Schiedon	Parliamentary leader of the People's Party for Freedom and Democracy in the Senate; 2015–present	Incumbent
Political offices
Preceded by Koos Andriessen; Ad interim	Minister of Transport and Water Management; 1994–1998	Succeeded by Tineke Netelenbos
Preceded by Hans Dijkstal	Deputy Prime Minister; 1998–2002; With: Els Borst	Succeeded by Eduard Bomhoff
Preceded by Hans van Mierlo	Deputy Prime Minister; 1998–2002; With: Els Borst	Succeeded by Johan Remkes
Preceded by Hans Wijers	Minister of Economic Affairs; 1998–2002	Succeeded by Herman Heinsbroek
Preceded by Ed Haaksman	Mayor of Delfzijl; Acting; 2003	Succeeded by Henk van Hoof; Ad interim
Preceded by Hans Ouwerkerk; Ad interim	Mayor of Almere; 2003–2015	Succeeded by Franc Weerwind
Business positions
Unknown	Chairwoman of the Supervisory board of Alliander; 2016–present	Incumbent
Non-profit organization positions
Unknown	Chairwoman of the Executive Board of the Association of Municipalities; 2008–2015	Succeeded by Jan van Zanen
