= Huelsman =

Huelsman is a surname. Notable people with the surname include:

- Frank Huelsman (1874–1959), American baseball player
- Joanne Huelsman (born 1938), American politician

== See also ==
- Hulsman
