= CAWU =

CAWU may refer to:

- Center for Arab-West Understanding, in Egypt
- Central Amalgamated Workers' Union, in New Zealand

== See also ==
- Association of Professional, Executive, Clerical and Computer Staff, previously the Clerical and Administrative Workers Union
- Dewa Cawu (?–1673), regent
