= Hulsman =

Hulsman is a surname. Notable people with the surname include:

- Ben Hulsman (1931–2018), Dutch actor
- Cornelis Hulsman (born 1955), Dutch sociologist
- Johann Hulsman (1610–1652), German Baroque painter
- John Hulsman (born 1967), American academic and writer
- Louk Hulsman (1923–2009), Dutch legal scientist and criminologist

== See also ==
- Hulsmans, a surname
