= Hulsmans =

Hulsmans is a surname. Notable people with the surname include:

- Jules Hulsmans (1898–?), Belgian modern pentathlete
- Kevin Hulsmans (born 1978), Belgian cyclist

== See also ==
- Hulsman, a surname
