= Hanja Maij-Weggen =

Dutch politician (born 1943)

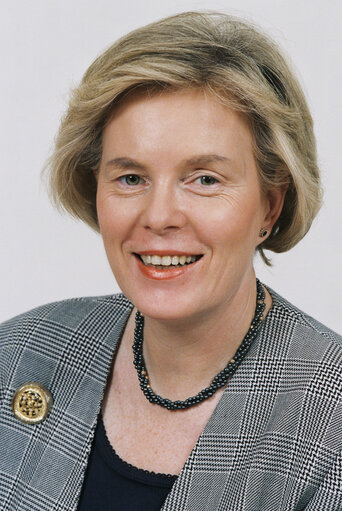
- Maij-Weggen in 1994

Queen's Commissioner of North Brabant
- In office 1 October 2003 – 1 October 2009
- Monarch: Beatrix
- Preceded by: Frank Houben
- Succeeded by: Wim van de Donk

Minister of Transport and Water Management
- In office 7 November 1989 – 16 July 1994
- Prime Minister: Ruud Lubbers
- Preceded by: Neelie Kroes
- Succeeded by: Koos Andriessen (Ad interim)

Member of the European Parliament
- In office 19 July 1994 – 1 October 2003
- In office 17 July 1979 – 7 November 1989
- Parliamentary group: Group of the European; People's Party (1979–2003); Christian Democratic Group (1979)

Personal details
- Born: Johanna Rieka Hermanna Weggen; 29 December 1943 (age 82) Klazienaveen, Netherlands
- Party: Christian Democratic Appeal (from 1980)
- Other political affiliations: Anti-Revolutionary Party (until 1980)
- Children: Hester Maij (born 1969); Marit Maij (born 1972)
- Education: University of Amsterdam (Bachelor of Arts, Bachelor of Education)
- Occupation: Politician; corporate director; nonprofit director; teacher; nurse; lobbyist

Johanna Rika Hermanna "Hanja" Maij-Weggen (Dutch pronunciation: [ˈɦɑɲaː maːi ˈʋɛɣə(n)]; née Weggen; born 29 December 1943) is a retired Dutch politician of the Christian Democratic Appeal (CDA).

== Political career ==
From 1989 until 1994 she was Minister of Transport, Public Works and Water Management in the third cabinet of prime minister Ruud Lubbers, and from 2003 until 2009 the Queen's Commissioner of the province of North Brabant. After a nursing education from 1962 until 1965 she studied Pedagogy and History of Art at the University of Amsterdam until 1971. In 1967, she started working as a healthcare teacher in Amstelveen and Apeldoorn. In 1979, her political career started when she became a member of the European Parliament. In 1989, she temporarily left the European Parliament to become the Dutch Minister of Transport, Public Works and Water Management. Four years later, she returned to the European Parliament where she remained until 1 October 2003 when she became the Queen's Commissioner for the province of North Brabant. She retired on 1 October 2009.

== Personal life ==
She is the mother of CDA politician Hester Maij and PvdA MP Marit Maij. She was the president of World Animal Protection from 2000 until 2012.

== Decorations ==
Honours
Ribbon bar	Honour	Country	Date	Comment
	Knight of the Order of the Netherlands Lion	Netherlands	8 October 1994	
	Commander of the Order of Orange-Nassau	Netherlands	1 October 2009	

Political offices
Preceded by Neelie Kroes	Minister of Transport and Water Management; 1989–1994	Succeeded by Koos Andriessen; Ad interim
Preceded by Frank Houben	Queen's Commissioner of North Brabant; 2003–2009	Succeeded by Wim van de Donk
Non-profit organization positions
Unknown	Chairwoman of the World Animal; Protection Netherlands; 2000–2012	Succeeded by Bob van den Bos
