= Marit Maij =

Dutch politician (born 1972)

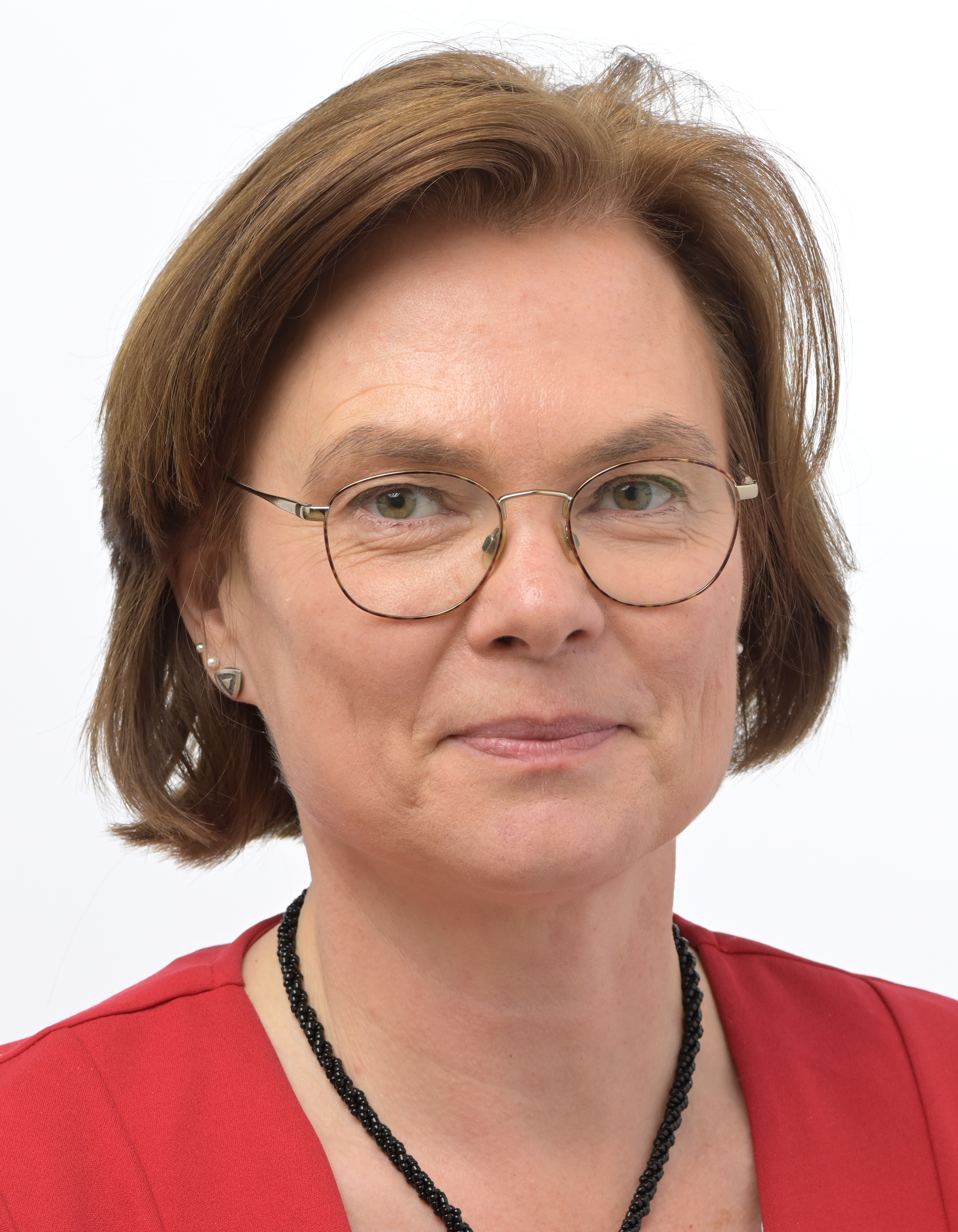

Member of the European Parliament
- Incumbent
- Assumed office 16 July 2024
- Parliamentary group: Progressive Alliance of Socialists and Democrats
- Constituency: Netherlands

Member of the House of Representatives
- In office 20 September 2012 – 23 March 2017

Personal details
- Born: Marit Elisabeth Maij; 16 January 1972 (age 54) Apeldoorn, Netherlands
- Party: Labour Party; Party of European Socialists
- Parent: Hanja Maij-Weggen (mother)

Marit Elisabeth Maij (Dutch pronunciation: [ˈmaːrɪt eːˈlisaːbɛt ˈmaːi]; born 16 January 1972) is a Dutch politician, management consultant, diplomat, and civil servant. She was a member of the House of Representatives for the Labour Party between 20 September 2012 and 23 March 2017. She was elected to the European Parliament in June 2024.

== Early life and education ==
Marit Elisabeth Maij was born on 16 January 1972 in Apeldoorn in the Netherlands. She is the daughter of Christian Democratic Appeal politician Hanja Maij-Weggen.

During her late teens she was president of LAKS, an association of Dutch pupils.

Maij studied political science at the University of Amsterdam, obtained an MBA from the European University, and studied at the Open University of Catalonia.

== Career ==
Maij worked as an assistant to the CDA parliamentary group in the European Parliament, at the Ministry of Foreign Affairs, at the embassies in Costa Rica and Beijing, and as an advisor to several other Dutch Ministries.

=== House of Representatives ===
As a member of the Labour Party (Partij van de Arbeid) Maij was a member of the House of Representatives between 20 September 2012 and 23 March 2017. In parliament, she served on the Committee on Foreign Affairs, the Defence Committee, the Committee on European Affairs and the Committee on Foreign Trade and Development Cooperation.

In addition to her role in parliament, Maij served as member of the Dutch delegation to the Parliamentary Assembly of the Council of Europe between 2016 and 2017. She was the First Vice-chairperson of the Committee on Equality and Non-Discrimination; a member of the Committee on the Honouring of Obligations and Commitments by Member States of the Council of Europe (Monitoring Committee); and a member of the Committee on Migration, Refugees and Displaced Persons. Between 2016 and 2017, she prepared the Assembly's proposal on measures to prevent and combat online hate.

=== European Parliament ===
Maij ran for the European Parliament in June 2024 as the third candidate on the shared GroenLinks–PvdA list. The party won a plurality of eight seats, and Maij was elected. Her focus has been on social affairs, employment, development cooperation, and gender equality, and she has served on the following committees:

- Committee on Employment and Social Affairs
- Delegation to the CARIFORUM–EU Parliamentary Committee
- Delegation to the ACP–EU Joint Parliamentary Assembly
- Delegation to the Africa–EU Parliamentary Assembly
- Committee on Development (substitute)
- Committee on Budgetary Control (substitute)
- Delegation for relations with the People's Republic of China (substitute)
- Delegation for relations with the countries of South Asia (substitute)

=== Other functions ===
From 2019 to 2024 Maij worked for non-governmental organisations: in 2019 she became managing director of CNV Internationaal, the international cooperation branch of the Dutch Christian National Trade Union Federation (CNV) and from 2021 until 2024 she was managing director of ActionAid Netherlands.

== Electoral history ==
Electoral history of Marit Maij
Year	Body	Party	Pos.	Votes	Result		Ref.
Year	Body	Party	Pos.	Votes	Party seats	Individual	Ref.
2024	European Parliament	GroenLinks–PvdA	3	182,317	8	Won	
