= Hans Wijers =

Dutch politician and businessman (born 1951)

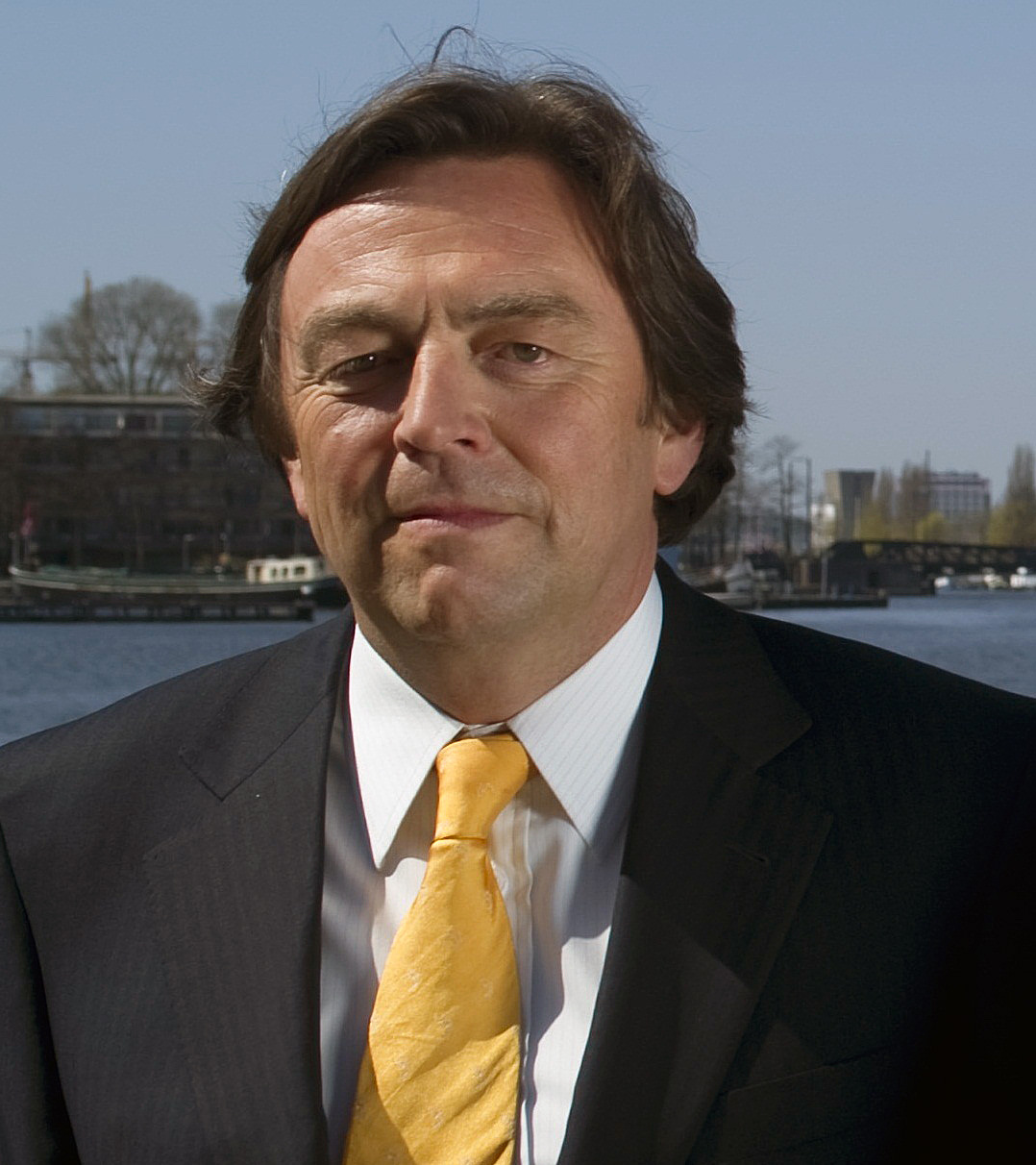
- Wijers in 2010

Minister of Finance
- In office 4 June 1996 – 26 June 1996; Ad interim
- Prime Minister: Wim Kok
- Preceded by: Gerrit Zalm
- Succeeded by: Gerrit Zalm

Minister of Economic Affairs
- In office 22 August 1994 – 3 August 1998
- Prime Minister: Wim Kok
- Preceded by: Koos Andriessen
- Succeeded by: Annemarie Jorritsma

Personal details
- Born: Gerardus Johannes Wijers; 11 January 1951 (age 75) Oostburg, Netherlands
- Party: Democrats 66 (since 1976)
- Domestic partner: Edith Sijmons (since 1988)
- Children: 2
- Education: University of Groningen; Erasmus University Rotterdam (PhD)
- Occupation: Politician · Civil servant · Economist · Businessman · Professor

Gerardus Johannes "Hans" Wijers (born 11 January 1951) is a Dutch retired politician and businessman who served as Minister of Economic Affairs from 1994 to 1998 under Prime Minister Wim Kok. A member of the Democrats 66 (D66) party, he has been the chairman of the supervisory board of ING Group since 2018.

== Early life ==
After secondary school at Hogere Burgerschool (HBS-B) level, Wijers studied economics at the University of Groningen, where he graduated cum laude in 1976. As assistant professor, he taught economics at the Erasmus University, and in 1982 received a doctorate for his research in "Industrial politics: the design of governmental policy for industrial sectors".

== Civil service ==
From 1982 till 1984, Wijers worked as a civil servant at the ministry of Social Affairs and Labour and later at the ministry of Economic Affairs. Subsequently, he became a management consultant at, amongst others, Horringa & De Koning, which later became part of Boston Consulting Group.

== Politics ==
Wijers, a member of D66 since 1976, was asked in 1994 by his party colleague Hans van Mierlo to take up a ministerial post in the First Kok cabinet. As Minister of Economic Affairs he was responsible for the law change regarding the extending of shop opening hours, and he formulated the Competition Regulation law which triggered the foundation of the Dutch Competition Authority. An important event in his ministry was the bankruptcy of the Fokker aircraft factory in March 1996. When Wijers refused further state aid due to a lack of a clear future perspective, German company DASA withdrew as parent company.

By the end of the cabinet period, Hans van Mierlo had decided not to stand for re-election. The party leaders exercised strong pressure on the popular Wijers to take on the party leadership. When the second purple cabinet was formed after the election in 1998, Wijers expressed that he had no interest in a second term as minister.

== Life after politics ==
In 1999 Wijers picked up his old career as a consultant: he became senior partner and chairman of the Dutch branch of the consulting firm The Boston Consulting Group. In July 2002 he became a member of the Board of Directors of Akzo Nobel NV and on 1 May 2003 he became chairman of the board of directors. He succeeded Kees van Lede. Under his leadership the pharmacy branch of Organon, (Organon BioSciences), was sold in 2007 and the British ICI was acquired. AkzoNobel focused more to paint and chemistry. At the end of April 2012 he decided to resign as chairman of the board. He was succeeded by Ton Büchner.

Wijers has been non-executive director at Royal Dutch Shell since January 2009; he later became vice-chairman. He is President of Heineken and supervisory director at HAL Holding NV. He is also chairman of the Vereniging Natuurmonumenten and chairman of the supervisory board of the Royal Concertgebouw NV. In 2010 he was chairman of the jury of the Libris Literature Prize. In 2013 he was chairman of the National Committee inauguration for King Willem-Alexander of the Netherlands.

From 2021 to 2022, Wijers was a member of the Trilateral Commission’s Task Force on Global Capitalism in Transition, chaired by Carl Bildt, Kelly Grier and Takeshi Niinami.

In November 2025, Wijers was asked to become one of the two informateurs in the process of forming a new coalition after the October parliamentary elections. Within 20 hours after accepting this role, he already resigned from it because of a publication by newspaper NRC that he had expressed himself in a very negative manner about VVD party leader Yeşilgöz. The commotion around this forced him to step down immediately in order not to damage the formation process.

== Personal ==
Wijers lives with his partner, and has two children.

== Decorations ==
Honours
Ribbon bar	Honour	Country	Date	Comment
	Officer of the Order of Orange-Nassau	Netherlands	30 October 1998	

Political offices
Preceded by Koos Andriessen	Minister of Economic Affairs; 1994–1998	Succeeded by Annemarie Jorritsma
Preceded by Gerrit Zalm	Minister of Finance; Ad interim 1996	Succeeded by Gerrit Zalm
Business positions
Unknown	CEO and Chairman of the Boston Consulting; Group Netherlands; 1999–2001	Unknown
Preceded by Kees van Lede	CEO and Chairman of AkzoNobel; 2003–2012	Succeeded by Ton Büchner
Unknown	Vice Chairman of Royal Dutch Shell; 2009–2018	Succeeded by Gerard Kleisterlee
Preceded by Steven ten Have	Chairman of the Supervisory board of AFC Ajax N.V. 2012–2015	Succeeded by Leo van Wijk
Preceded by Kees van Lede	Chairman of the Supervisory board of Heineken N.V. 2012–present	Succeeded by Jean-Marc Huët
Preceded by Jeroen van der Veer	Chairman of the Supervisory board of the ING Group; 2018–present	Incumbent
Non-profit organization positions
Preceded by Ed Nijpels	Chairman of the Netherlands World Wide; Fund for Nature; 1999–2003	Succeeded by Ruud Lubbers
Preceded by Office established	Chairman of the Orange Foundation; 2002–2011	Succeeded by Joop Wijn
Preceded by Cees Veerman	Chairman of the Vereniging Natuurmonumenten; 2011–present	Incumbent
Preceded by Alexander Rinnooy Kan	Chairman of the Concertgebouw Foundation; 2015–present	Incumbent
