= Jan de Pous =

Dutch politician (1920–1996)

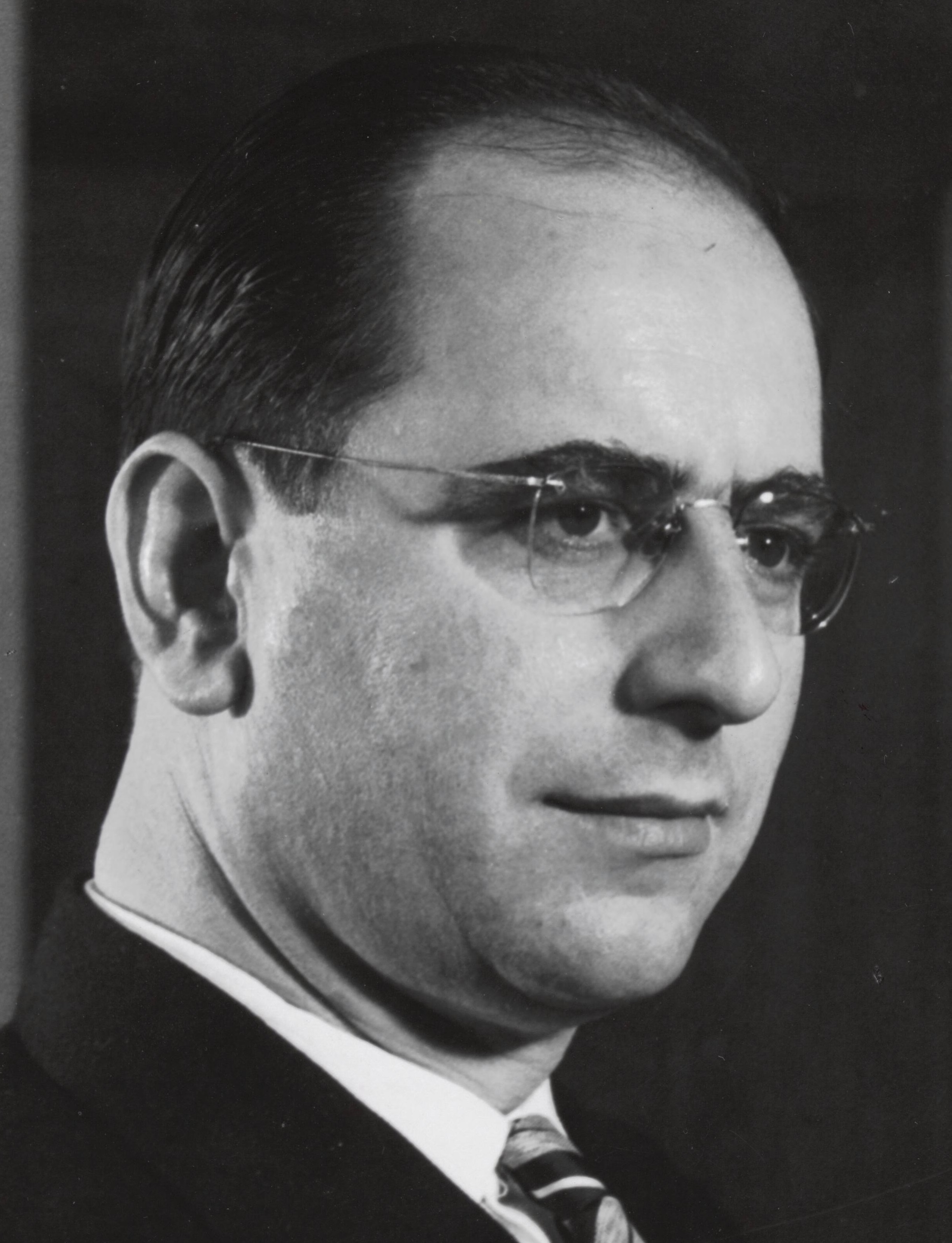
- De Pous in 1964

Chairman of the Social and Economic Council
- In office 1 May 1964 – 1 February 1985
- Preceded by: Gerard Verrijn Stuart
- Succeeded by: Theo Quené

Minister of Economic Affairs
- In office 19 May 1959 – 24 July 1963
- Prime Minister: Jan de Quay
- Preceded by: Jelle Zijlstra
- Succeeded by: Koos Andriessen

Member of the Council of State
- In office 1 December 1958 – 19 May 1959
- Vice President: Bram Rutgers

Member of the Social and Economic Council
- In office 1 August 1963 – 1 May 1964
- Chairman: Gerard Verrijn Stuart (1963–1964)
- In office 15 March 1951 – 1 December 1958
- Chairman: Frans de Vries (1951–1958); Gerard Verrijn Stuart (1958)

Personal details
- Born: Jan Willem de Pous; 23 January 1920 Aalsmeer, Netherlands
- Died: 6 January 1996 (aged 75) The Hague, Netherlands
- Party: Christian Democratic Appeal (from 1980)
- Other political affiliations: Christian Historical Union (until 1980)
- Spouse: Greet de Pous (m. 1951)
- Children: 2 daughters and 1 son
- Education: University of Amsterdam (Bachelor of Economics, Master of Economics); Northwestern University (Master of Financial Economics)
- Occupation: Politician · Civil servant · Economist · Researcher · Businessman · Corporate director · Nonprofit director · Trade association executive · Editor · Author · Professor

Jan Willem de Pous (23 January 1920 – 6 January 1996) was a Dutch politician of the defunct Christian Historical Union (CHU) party now merged into the Christian Democratic Appeal (CDA) party and economist.

== Biography ==
De Pous attended the Amsterdams Lyceum from June 1935 until June 1938 and applied at the University of Amsterdam in June 1939 majoring in Economics and obtaining a Bachelor of Economics degree before leaving the University during the German occupation in April 1942 and joined the Dutch resistance against the German occupiers and worked as a journalist for the underground newspaper Trouw from April 1942 until January 1946. Following the end of World War II De Pous returned to the University of Amsterdam in July 1945 and also worked as a researcher before graduating with a Master of Economics degree in July 1947. De Pous applied at the Northwestern University in Evanston, Illinois in July 1947 for a postgraduate education and obtained a Master of Financial Economics degree in November 1949. De Pous worked as a trade association executive for the Christian Employers' association (NCW) served as General-Secretary from 1 November 1949 until 1 January 1953 and as an associate professor of Public economics at the University of Amsterdam from 1 January 1953 until 1 December 1958. On 8 October 1958 De Pous was nominated as Member of the Council of State, taking office on 1 December 1958. After the election of 1959 De Pous was appointed as Minister of Economic Affairs in the Cabinet De Quay, taking office on 19 May 1959. In February 1963 De Pous announced that he would not stand for the election of 1963. Following the cabinet formation of 1963 De Pous was not giving a cabinet post in the new cabinet, the Cabinet De Quay was replaced by the Cabinet Marijnen on 24 July 1963.

De Pous remained in active politics, in April 1964 De Pous was nominated as Chairman of the Social and Economic Council (SER), serving from 1 May 1964 until 1 February 1985. De Pous also became active in the private sector and public sector and occupied numerous seats as a corporate director and nonprofit director on several boards of directors and supervisory boards (Overloon War Museum, Institute for Multiparty Democracy, ProDemos and the International Institute of Social History) and served on several state commissions and councils on behalf of the government (Cals-Donner Commission, Mijnraad, Raad voor Cultuur and Stichting Pensioenfonds ABP).

== Decorations ==
=== Honours ===
Honours
Ribbon bar	Honour	Country	Date	Comment
	Knight of the Order of the Netherlands Lion	Netherlands	27 July 1963	
	Grand Officer of the Order of Orange-Nassau	Netherlands	1 February 1985	Elevated from Commander (30 April 1974)

== Honorary degrees ==
Honorary degrees
University	Field	Country	Date	Comment
Tilburg University	Economics	Netherlands	24 November 1977	

Political offices
Preceded by Jelle Zijlstra	Minister of Economic Affairs; 1959–1963	Succeeded by Koos Andriessen
Civic offices
Preceded by Gerard Verrijn Stuart	Chairman of the Social and Economic Council; 1964–1985	Succeeded by Theo Quené
Preceded by Wim van der Grinten	Chairman of the Mine Council; 1968–1986	Succeeded by Wim van der Grinten
Preceded by Isaäc Arend; Diepenhorst	Chairman of the Supervisory board of Stichting Pensioenfonds ABP; 1980–1988	Succeeded by Jaap Boersma
Business positions
Preceded by Jan van Aartsen	General-Secretary of the Christian Employers' association 1949–1953	Unknown
