= Koos Andriessen =

Dutch politician (1928–2019)

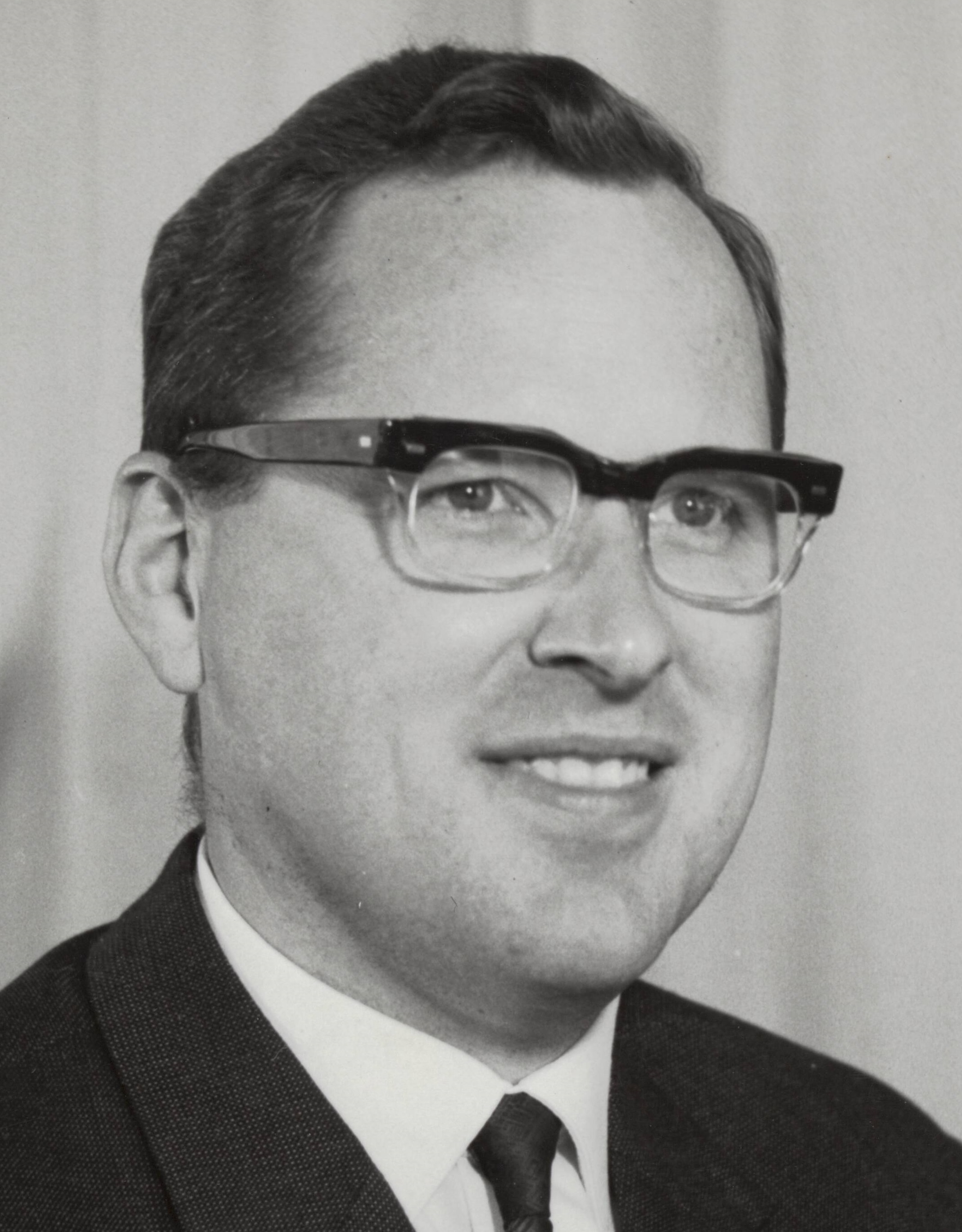
- Andriessen in 1963

Minister of Transport and Water Management
- In office 16 July 1994 – 22 August 1994; Ad interim
- Prime Minister: Ruud Lubbers
- Preceded by: Hanja Maij-Weggen
- Succeeded by: Annemarie Jorritsma

Minister of Economic Affairs
- In office 7 November 1989 – 22 August 1994
- Prime Minister: Ruud Lubbers
- Preceded by: Rudolf de Korte
- Succeeded by: Hans Wijers
- In office 24 July 1963 – 14 April 1965
- Prime Minister: Victor Marijnen
- Preceded by: Jan de Pous
- Succeeded by: Joop den Uyl

Member of the Social and Economic Council
- In office 1 January 1988 – 7 November 1989
- Chairman: Theo Quené
- In office 1 November 1959 – 24 July 1963
- Chairman: Gerard Verrijn Stuart

Personal details
- Born: Jacobus Eije Andriessen; 25 July 1928 Rotterdam, Netherlands
- Died: 22 January 2019 (aged 90) Wassenaar, Netherlands
- Party: Christian Democratic Appeal (from 1980)
- Other political affiliations: Christian Historical Union (until 1980)
- Education: Erasmus University Rotterdam (Bachelor of Economics, Master of Economics); Vrije Universiteit Amsterdam (Doctor of Philosophy)
- Occupation: Politician · Civil servant · Economist · Financial adviser · Businessman ·Corporate director · Nonprofit director · Trade association executive · Lobbyist · Author · Professor

Jacobus Eije "Koos" Andriessen (25 July 1928 – 22 January 2019) was a Dutch politician of the defunct Christian Historical Union (CHU) party and later the Christian Democratic Appeal (CDA) party and businessman.

Andriessen worked as a researcher at the Vrije Universiteit Amsterdam from March 1951 until September 1955. Andriessen worked as civil servant for the Ministry of Economic Affairs from September 1955 until November 1959 as Director-General of the department for Political Policy from September 1955 until May 1956 and Director-General of the department for General Economic Policy from May 1956 until September 1959. Andriessen worked as professor of Political economy at the University of Amsterdam from 15 September 1959 until 24 July 1963. Andriessen also worked as a financial adviser for the Ministry of Finance from 15 September 1959 until 24 July 1963. After the election of 1963 Andriessen was appointed as Minister of Economic Affairs in the Cabinet Marijnen, taking office on 24 July 1963. The Cabinet Marijnen fell on 27 February 1965 and continued to serve in a demissionary capacity until it was replaced by the Cabinet Cals on 14 April 1965.

Andriessen retired from active politics and became active in the private sector and public sector. He worked as a corporate director for the packaging and labeling company Van Leer from 1 October 1965 until 15 September 1987 and as CFO from 15 April 1970 until 1 January 1980 and as CEO and Chairman of the board of directors, taking office on from 1 January 1980. In September 1987 Andriessen was nominated as a Chairman of the Christian Employers' association (NCW). He resigned as CEO and Chairman of the board of directors of Van Leer on 15 September 1987 and was installed as Chairman of the Christian Employers' association on 1 January 1988. After the election of 1989 Andriessen was again appointed as Minister of Economic Affairs in the Cabinet Lubbers III, taking office on 7 November 1989. Andriessen served as acting Minister of Transport and Water Management from 16 July 1994 until 22 August 1994 following the resignation Hanja Maij-Weggen. In November 1993 Andriessen announced his retirement from national politics and that he would not stand for the election of 1994. The Cabinet Lubbers III was replaced by the Cabinet Kok I on 22 August 1994.

After his retirement Andriessen returned to the private sector and public sector and occupied numerous seats as a corporate director and nonprofit director (ING Group, Hunter Douglas, Ballast Nedam, Elsevier, Diergaarde Blijdorp, Mittal Steel Company, Society for Statistics and Operations Research and the Internet Society) and serves on several state commissions on behalf of the government.

== Biography ==
=== Early life ===
Andriessen joined the Social Economic Council in 1959, giving up that position when he was appointed Dutch Minister of Economic Affairs in 1963.

=== Politics ===
Andriessen held this position until 1965, when he joined the board of the Van Leer Group of Companies. He rose to become the chairman of Van Leer, before leaving in 1987 to become chairman of the Dutch Christian Employers Association. Then in 1989 he returned to the role of Dutch Minister of Economic Affairs, a position he held until 1994. Andriessen has played an important role on the Supervisory Boards of such companies as Ballast Nedam, Elsevier, Randstad, ING Group, Hunter Douglas and Novograaf.

=== Publications ===
- Theorie van de Economische Politiek (Stenfert Kroese, Leiden 1962), a sound textbook on economic policy featuring contributions from Dutch and Belgian experts: among others J.E. Andriessen (ed.), Marcel van Meerhaeghe (ed.), Pieter Hennipman and H.W. Lambers.

== Decorations ==
Honours
Ribbon bar	Honour	Country	Date	Comment
	Grand Officer of the Order of the Crown	Belgium	12 April 1992	
	Grand Cross 1st Class of the Order of Merit	Germany	10 November 1993	
	Commander of the Order of Orange-Nassau	Netherlands	8 October 1994	Elevated from Officer (30 April 1988)
	Commander of the Order of the Netherlands Lion	Netherlands	15 February 1998	Elevated from Knight (20 April 1963)

Political offices
Preceded by Hanja Maij-Weggen	Minister of Transport and Water Management; Ad interim 1994	Succeeded by Annemarie Jorritsma
Preceded by Jan de Pous	Minister of Economic Affairs; 1963–1965; 1989–1994	Succeeded by Joop den Uyl
Preceded by Rudolf de Korte	Minister of Economic Affairs; 1963–1965; 1989–1994	Succeeded by Hans Wijers
Business positions
Unknown	Chairman of the Christian Employers' association 1988–1989	Unknown
