= Heilig Landstichting =

Village in the municipality of Berg en Dal, Gelderland, Netherlands

Heilig Landstichting De Ploeg
- Village
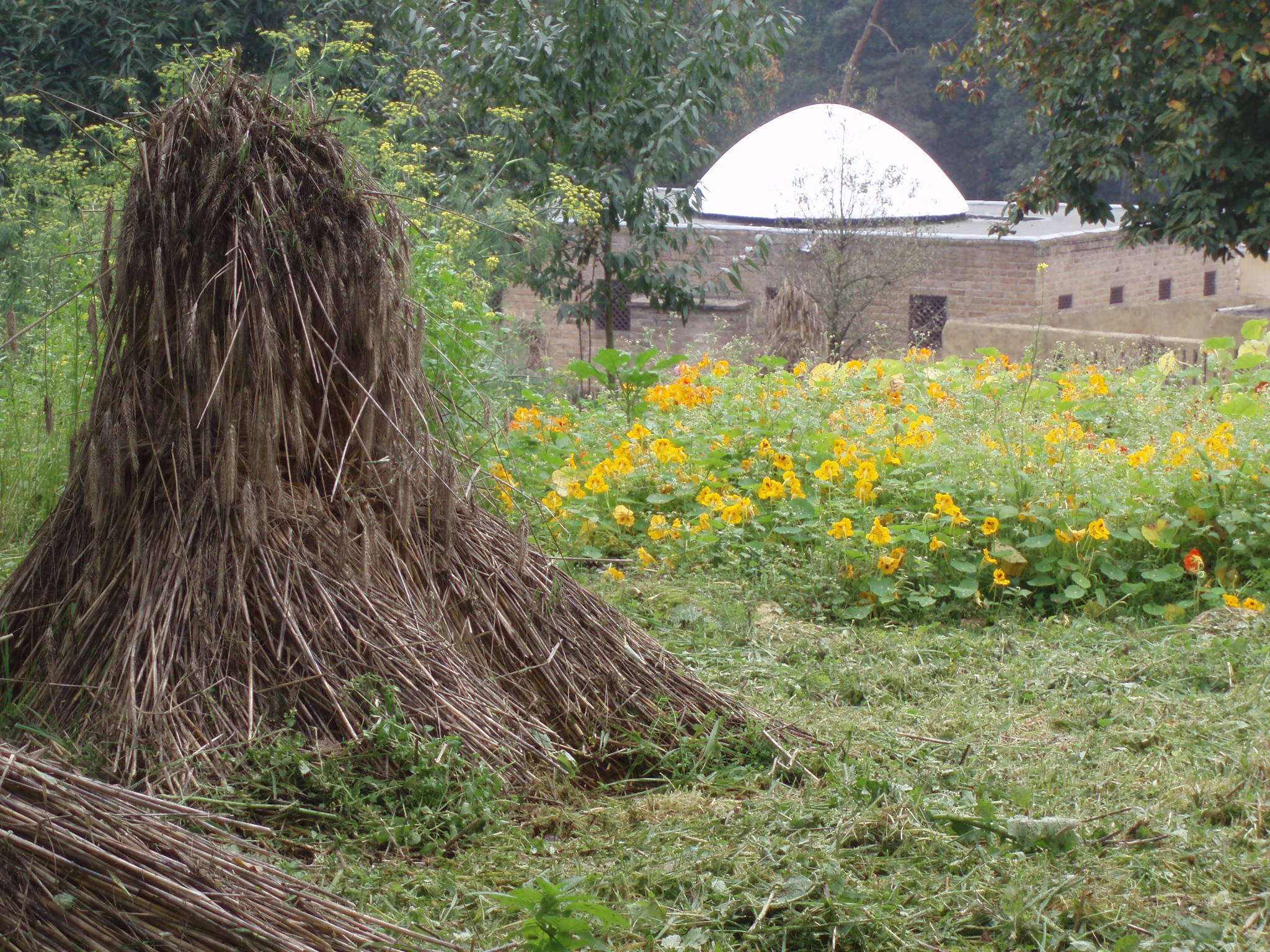
- Beth Juda in Heilig Landstichting

- Location in the province of Gelderland Heilig Landstichting (Netherlands)
- Coordinates: 51°49′N 5°53′E
- Country: Netherlands
- Province: Gelderland
- Municipality: Berg en Dal

Area
  - Total: 2.27 km^{2} (0.88 sq mi)
- Elevation: 54 m (177 ft)

Population (2021)
  - Total: 830
  - Density: 370/km^{2} (950/sq mi)
- Time zone: UTC+1 (CET)
  - Summer (DST): UTC+2 (CEST)
- Postal code: 6564
- Dialing code: 024

Heilig Landstichting (Dutch pronunciation: [ˌɦɛi̯ləx ˈlɑntstɪxtɪŋ]) is a village in the eastern Netherlands. It is located in the municipality of Berg en Dal, Gelderland, near Nijmegen. Its best known attraction is the Museumpark Orientalis, the former Holy Land Museum. The village's name means 'Holy Land Foundation' in Dutch.

== History ==
The Heilig-Landstichting was founded in 1911 to give an overview of the time of the Bible and Palestina. In 1913, construction started, and since 2007 it is called Museumpark Orientalis. It used to be a little agricultural hamlet called De Ploeg. A village developed around the museum in along the roads. A convent was constructed in 1915. A basilicum was originally planned, but cancelled. After World War II, the village developed a more dense core.

== Gallery ==
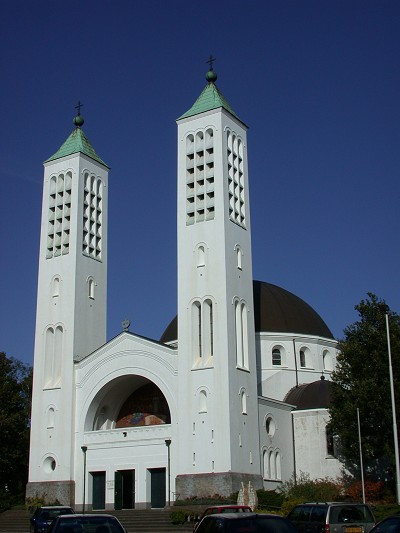
Cenakel Church

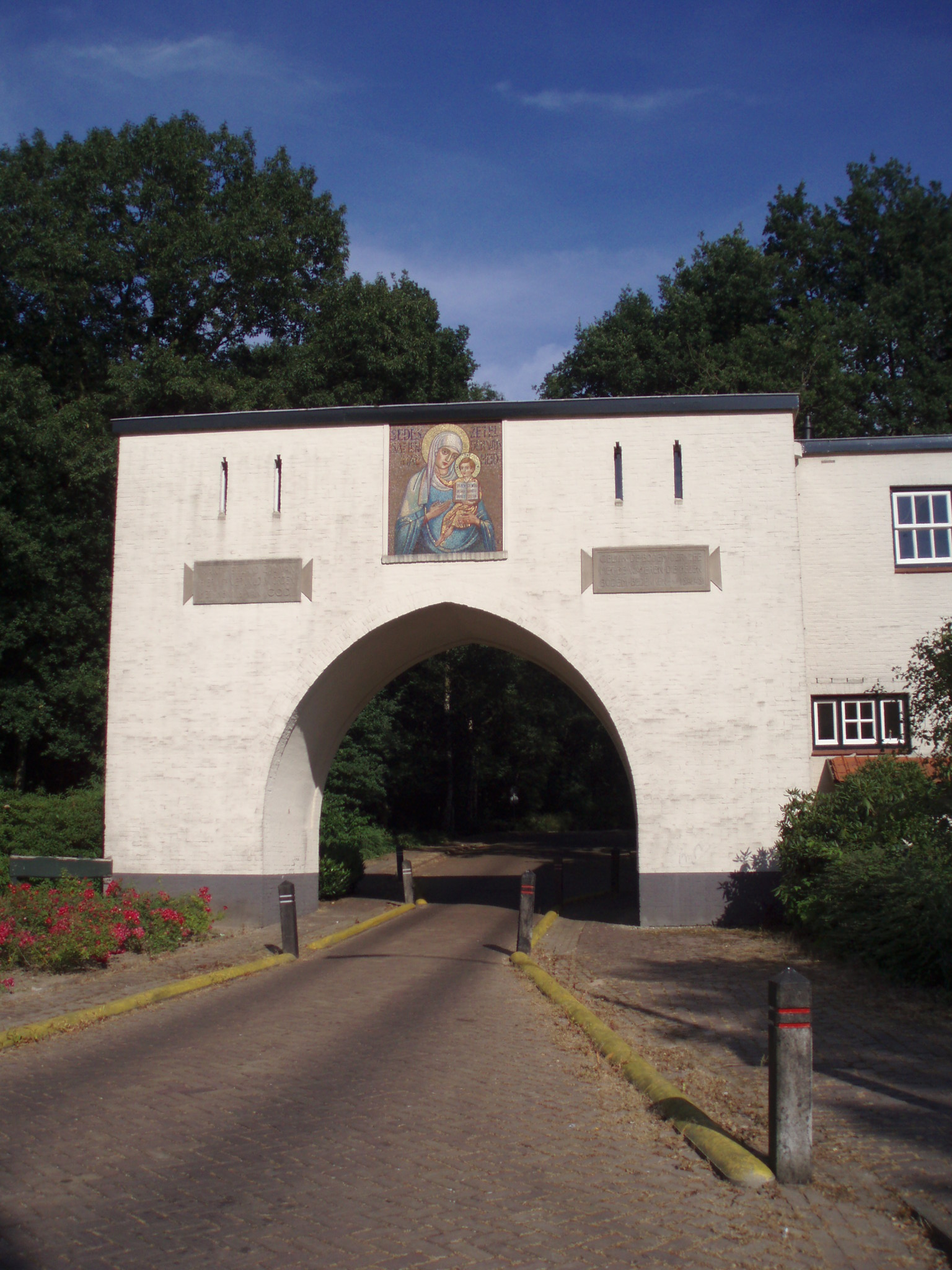
Museum entrance

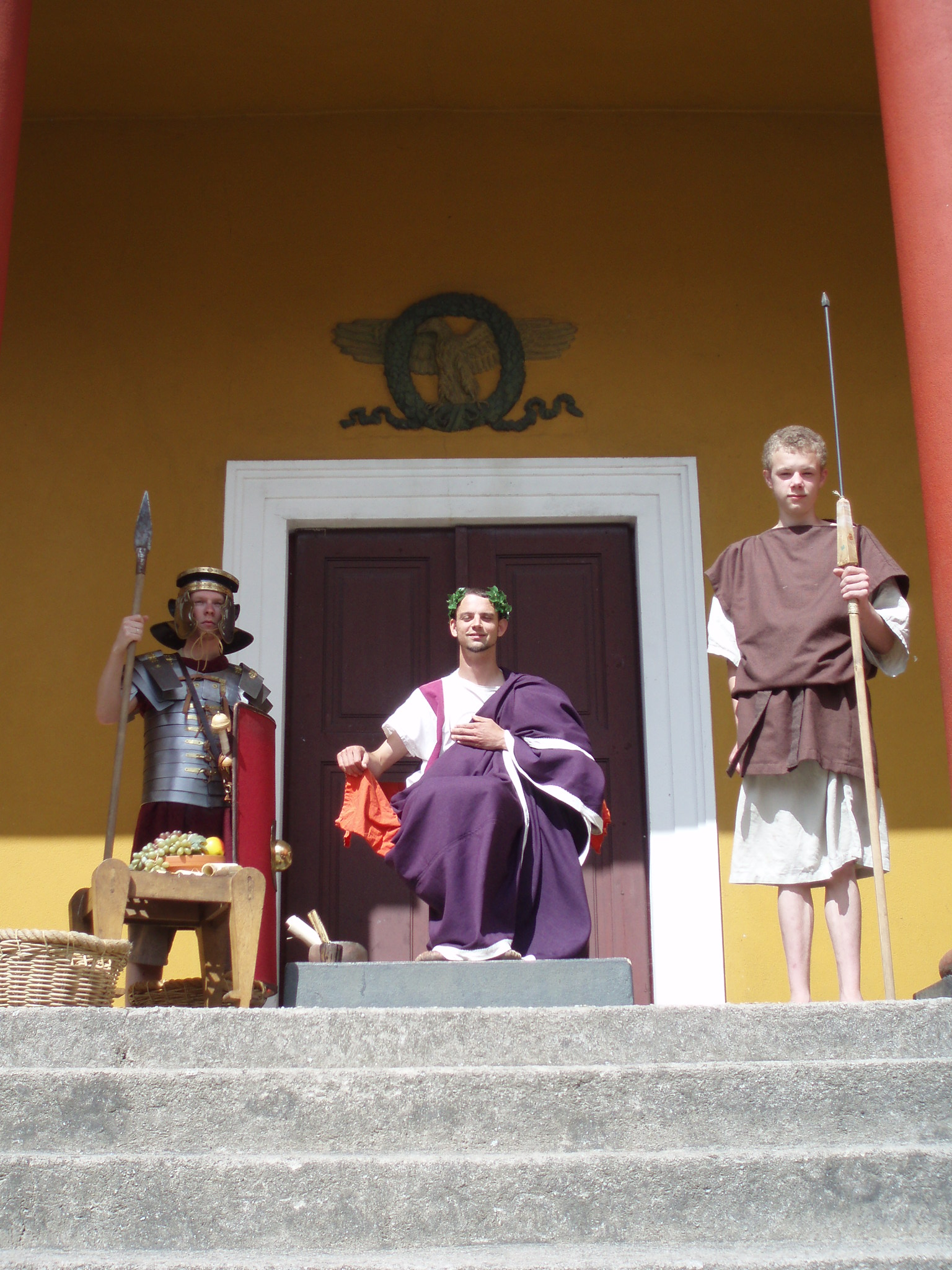
Museum pictures

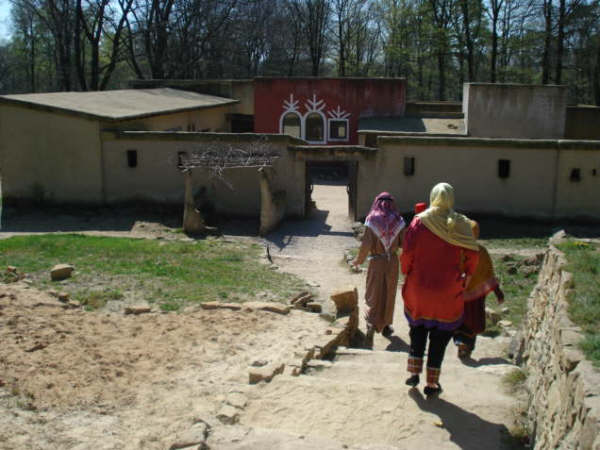

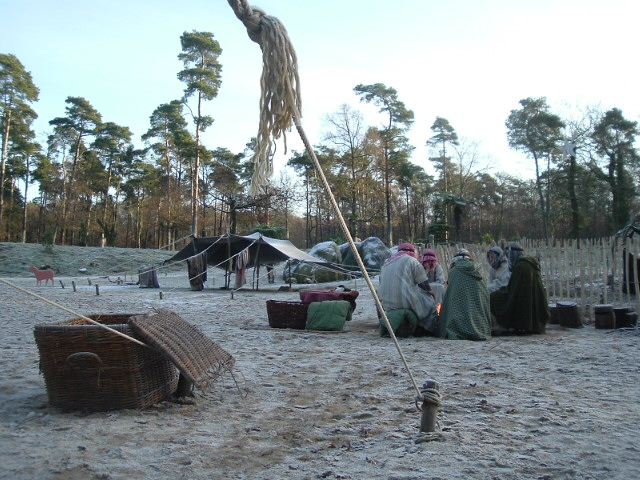

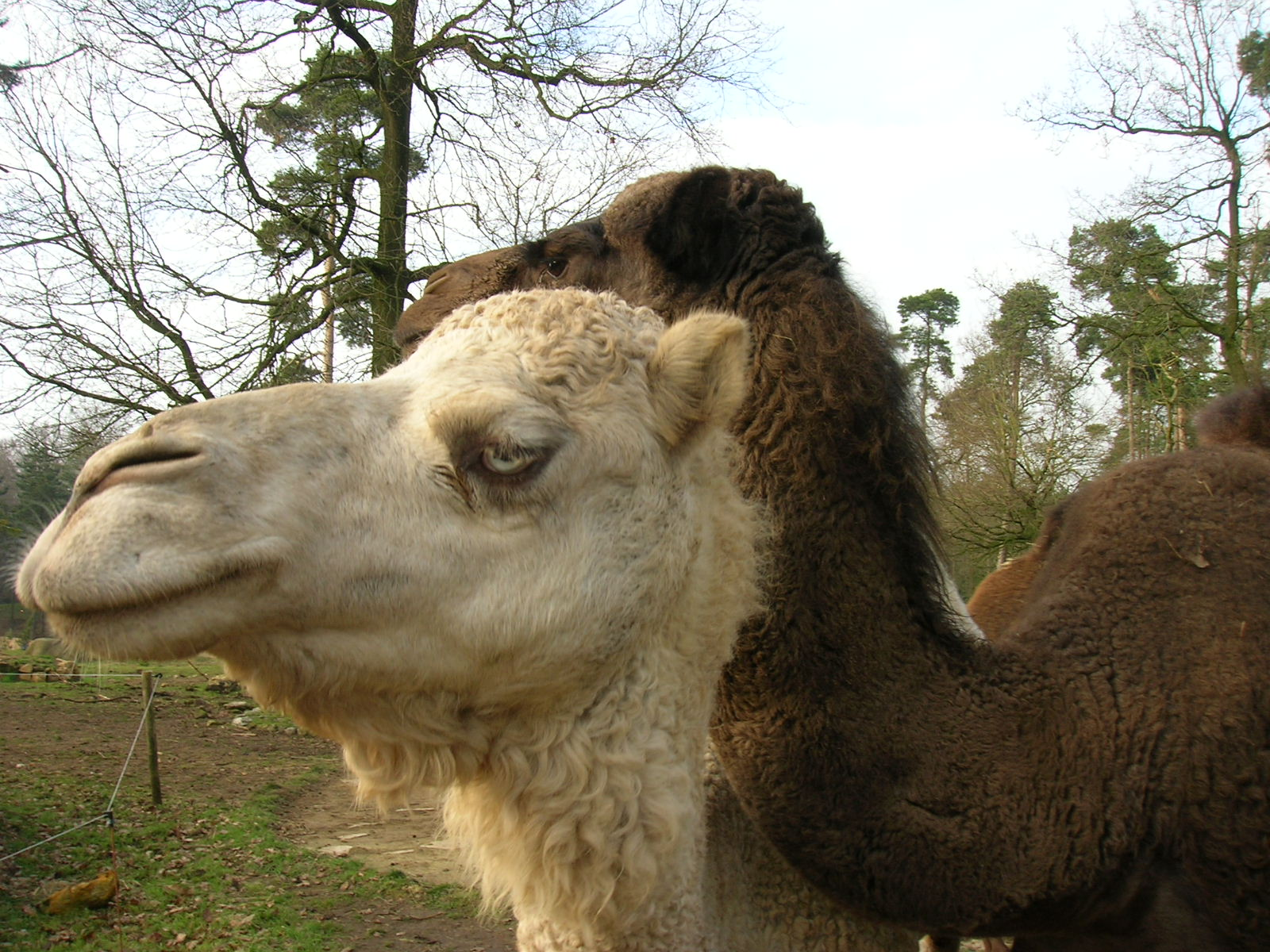

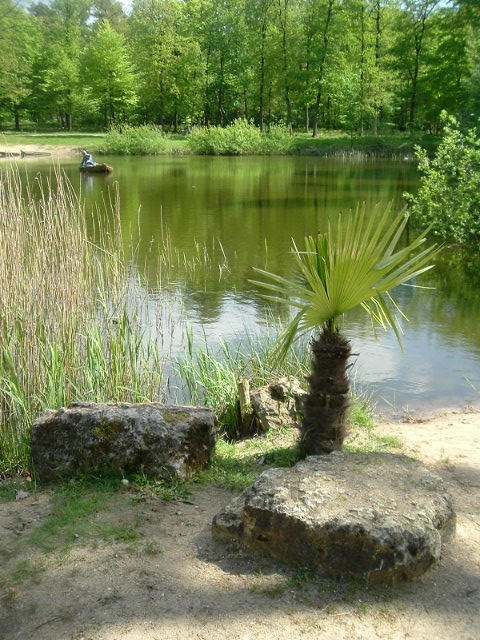

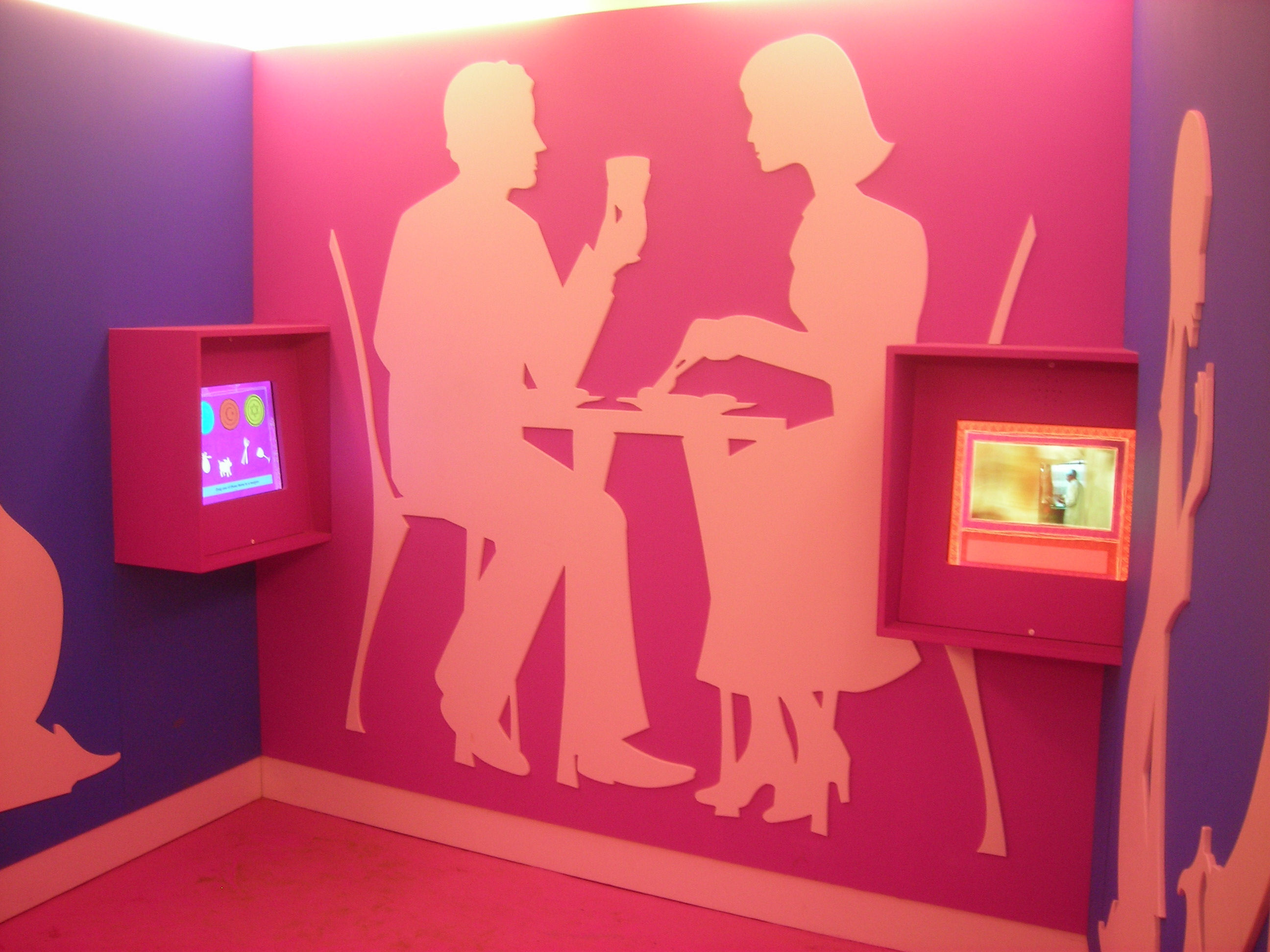
