= Baudartius College =

Coordinates: 52°8′43″N 6°11′54″E

Location
- Zutphen

Information
- Type: Secondary school

Baudartius College was a Dutch Protestant secondary school in Zutphen, named after the theologian Willem Baudartius.
