= Cornelis Hulsman =

Dutch sociologist

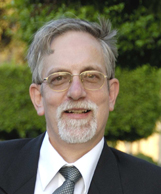
- Born: July 27, 1955 (age 70)
- Occupations: Director, Center for Intercultural Dialogue and Translation Co-Founder and Editor-in-Chief of Arab-West Report; Secretary-General of the Center for Arab-West Understanding Secretary-General of the Foreign Press Association, Cairo
- Spouse: Sawsan Gabra Ayoub Khalil

Cornelis Hulsman is a Dutch sociologist who has lived for years in Egypt since 1994. He is currently the editor in chief of the Arab-West Report, which is a report that includes a weekly digest of various Egyptian press outlets. Hulsman is further an expert on Egyptian printed media, The Coptic Orthodox Holy Family's tradition, interfaith relations in Egyptian society, and inter-cultural understanding in the Arab world. Hulsman has been a correspondent for several Dutch media outlets in Egypt, and has been the Secretary-General of the Cairo Foreign Press Association since 2003.

== Early life ==
Hulsman was born in Apeldoorn, the Netherlands, in 1955, and studied development sociology at the State University of Leiden in the Netherlands from 1977 to 1984. During his studies he specialized in Islam and Middle Eastern Christianity.

== Career ==
From 1979 to 1982, Hulsman was a member of the Foreign Affairs Committee of the Christian Democratic Youth Appeal (CDJA), and was from 1982 to 1994 a member of the Middle East Committee of the Christian Democratic Appeal (Dutch: Christen Democratisch Apel, CDA). From 1986 until 1994, Hulsman occupied several leading positions in the Dutch immigration service. In 1994, Hulsman became a correspondent for several Dutch media outlets in Egypt, and with his Egyptian wife Sawsan Gabra Ayoub Khalil, founded in 1997 the "Religious News Service from the Arab World". Archived from the original on 2008-10-19.

From 1999 to 2001, at the request of the American University Press in Cairo, Hulsman carried out research on the Coptic Orthodox Holy Family tradition and compared this with earlier work carried out by Dr. Otto F.A. Meinardus in the 1950s and 1960s. Hulsman's work resulted in the chapter “Tracing the Route of the Holy Family Today,” in the book “Be Thou There; The Holy Family's Journey in Egypt,” AUC Press, 2001. Following this research and publication, numerous magazine and newspaper publications on aspects of the Holy Family tradition followed. Hulsman also organized dozens of visits to places related to this tradition, built a Web site that deals with this tradition and has become one of the world's foremost experts on this ancient Coptic tradition.

In 2000 and 2001, Hulsman was the adjunct affiliate assistant professor in journalism and mass communication at the American University in Cairo, and in 2002 he organized a workshop for Egyptian journalists about reporting on human rights. Hulsman decided to devote his attention to developing an Egyptian institute for inter-cultural understanding, and in 2003 he changed the name of the electronic digest RNSAW to Arab-West Report. Following this, together with a group of prominent Egyptians, Hulsman started the "Center for Arab-West Understanding (CAWU)". CAWU then applied for Egyptian Non-Government Organization (NGO) status, which was granted after a long bureaucratic process in January 2008.

In 2004 Hulsman began building an electronic library based on the reviews of Egyptian media and his own investigative reporting in the Religious News Service from the Arab World and Arab-West Report since 1997. Because of the delays in forming an Egyptian NGO, in 2005 Hulsman and his wife founded the Center for Intercultural Dialogue and Translation (CIDT). CIDT has become the institute preparing media reviews and translations for Arab-West Report.

In May 2006, Hulsman organized the visit to Egypt of former Dutch prime minister Andreas van Agt, who lectured at universities and institutions in Cairo on the need for Arab-West understanding and met with prominent government officials to whom he expressed strong support for the initiative to create a Center for Arab-West Understanding. In August 2007 Hulsman became the project director of the Electronic Network for Arab-West Understanding (ENAWU). ENAWU links organizations in Egypt, Jordan, Lebanon with organizations in several European countries. This network was launched on June 5, 2008, by HRH Prince Hassan bin Talal. I

n March 2008 Hulsman coordinated efforts by the Center for Arab-West Understanding in a successful attempt to defuse the crises provoked by Dutch Member of Parliament Geert Wilders' film “Fitna,” through organizing a visit of a delegation of Dutch church representatives and Muslim organizations to Egypt which was widely reported on in the Netherlands, asking Egyptian scholars to write reports explaining the Qur'anic texts that Wilders addressed and discussing the crisis on Egyptian TV and in public meetings at Cairo University.

== Lectures ==
Hulsman lectured on cultural diversity, media, Arab-West relations, Muslim-Christian relations in the Netherlands, Belgium, Germany, Austria, Denmark, Czech Republic, Spain, U.S., Jordan and Egypt.

== Influences ==
During his studies Hulsman was deeply influenced by former Dutch Consul-General to Saudi Arabia, Daniel van der Meulen (1894–1989) who stimulated Hulsman's interest in the Arab world and Muslim-Christian relations., Syrian Orthodox Bishop Samuel Aktash of the Tur Abdin in Turkey who showed him in the mid eighties the damage caused by oriental Christians leaving their homelands, a theme repeated by HRH Prince Hassan bin-Talal in an interview with Hulsman for Christianity Today. Dr. Otto F.A. Meinardus (1925–2005), Egyptian thinker Dr. William Qilada (1924–1999), and Athanasius, Metropolitan of Beni Suef (1923–2000) influenced Hulsman's outlook on Coptic Christianity and traditions. Hulsman has in turn influenced hundreds of students, many of whom have been interns at Arab-West Report and the Center for Intercultural Dialogue in Cairo.

== Personal life ==
Hulsman has been living in Egypt on and off since 1994, he currently resides in the Netherlands with his wife and children.

== Selected Books & Reports ==
Cornelis Hulsman has published on a number of topics dealing with issues throughout the Arab world, Muslim-Christian relations, and Arab-West relations. Below are listed a selection of Hulsman's material.

- 'The Peace building Prince; One Jordanian leader shares his deep desire to preserve the Arab Christian world' in: Christianity Today, February 2008
- 'Christian activists' contributions to Christian migration from the Arab world; can Christianity survive in the Arab world?' "AWR, 2007, week 51, art. 2". Archived from the original on 2016-01-02.
- 'Reflections on conversions in Egypt' "AWR, 2007, week 50, art. 7".
- 'To be an effective advocate for peace, media distortions must be addressed' "Quaderns de la Mediterrània, June 2007, translated and published in Arabic in al-Muntada (Jordan), issue no. 234, 2007, AWR, 2007, week 14, art. 2".
- 'Different Middle Eastern Christian responses to living in a Muslim environment' "AWR, 2006, week 49, art. 3".
- 'Apostolic Nuncio to Egypt, Archbishop Fitzgerald, responds to polarization following the Regensburg lecture of H.H. Pope Benedict XV' "Rose al-Yousef, October 28, 2006 and AWR, 2006, week 32, art. 2".
- 'Dutch expert in intercultural dialogue, Cornelis Hulsman, to Rose al-Yūsuf: The absent truth in Pope Benedict's sedition. The pope made positive remarks about Islam, but they were lost in a volatile climate created by suspicions' "Rose al-Yousef, September 30, 2006 and AWR, 2006, week 30, art. 2".
- Reviewing Yustina Saleh's 'Law, the Rule of Law, and Religious Minorities in Egypt.' (art. 2 Egyptian Constitution) Reviewed with Prof. Dr. Mike Fowler and Prof. Dr. Wolfram Reiss "AWR, 2005, week 51, art. 49".
- Escalations following the alleged conversion of a priest's wife to Islam' a 45-page investigative report "AWR, 2004, week 51, art. 13". Archived from the original on 2016-03-04.
- 'The Muslim World and the West: what can be done to reduce tensions?' "AWR, 2004, week 51, art. 11".
- Chapter ‘Christian Life’ in ‘Upper Egypt; Life along the Nile,’ Ed. Prof. Dr. Nicholas Hopkins, 2003
- “Persecuted Christians? Case study of Egypt," in: "Persecuted Christians? Documentation of an international conference," Missio, 2002 "AWR, 2002, week 50, art. 30".
- 'Renewal in the Coptic Orthodox Church; review of the Ph.D. thesis of Revd. Dr. Wolfram Reiss' "AWR 2002, week 46, art. 23".
- 'Responses to the court verdict in the case of Al-Kosheh' "AWR, 2001, week 8, art. 9".
- 'Reviving an Ancient Faith; two strong-willed reformers bring Coptic Orthodoxy back to life' in Christianity Today, December 2001 "AWR, 2001, week 51, art. 13".
- The Refugee Savior. How Egyptian Christians still make room for the Holy Family' in Christianity Today, December 2001 "AWR, 2001, week 51, art. 12".
- Co-author of 'Be Thou There; the Holy Family's Journey in Egypt,' AUC-Press, Cairo, 2001
- 'Migration and a future for the Syrian Orthodox in the Tur Abdin,' Netherlands Interdisciplinair Demographic Institute, 1989. The research concerned the forced migration of a rural population to Istanbul and Europe.
- Dozens of other reports on Muslim-Christian relations placed in Arab-West Report, www.dialogueacrossborders.com These reports document investigative reporting with a Western sociological analysis of Muslim-Christian relations in Egypt, placing them in the context of Egyptian culture and socio-economic developments.
