= Wim van de Donk =

Dutch politician and academic

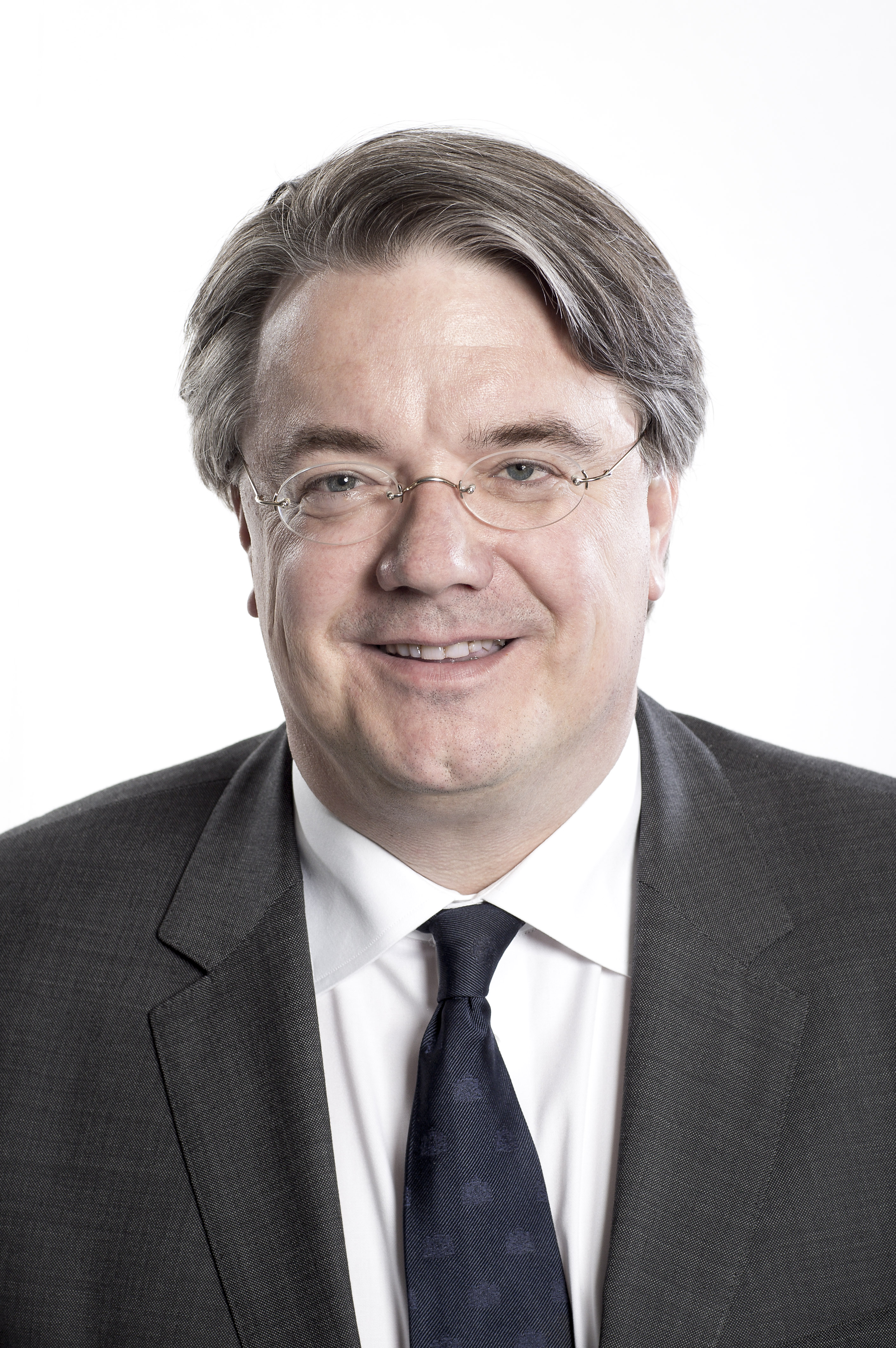
Wim van de Donk

Wilhelmus Bernhard Henricus Josephus "Wim" van de Donk (born 17 May 1962) is a Dutch former politician and former academic, who served as the King's Commissioner of North Brabant from 1 October 2009 to 1 October 2020. He is a member of the Christian Democratic Appeal (Christen-Democratisch Appèl, CDA). He has been presiding Tilburg University since 19 November 2020.

Born in Veghel, Van de Donk studied public administration at the Radboud University Nijmegen and Tilburg University. He, among others, worked at the Ministry of Justice. From 1999 to 2009 he was public administration professor at Tilburg University; from 2004 to 2009 he also was president of the Dutch Scientific Council for Government Policy (Wetenschappelijke Raad voor het Regeringsbeleid).

Wim van de Donk is married and has two daughters. He is a member of the Roman Catholic Church.

Political offices
Preceded by Hanja Maij-Weggen	King's Commissioner of North Brabant; 2009–2020	Succeeded by Ina Adema
