= Frank Houben =

Dutch politician (1939–2023)

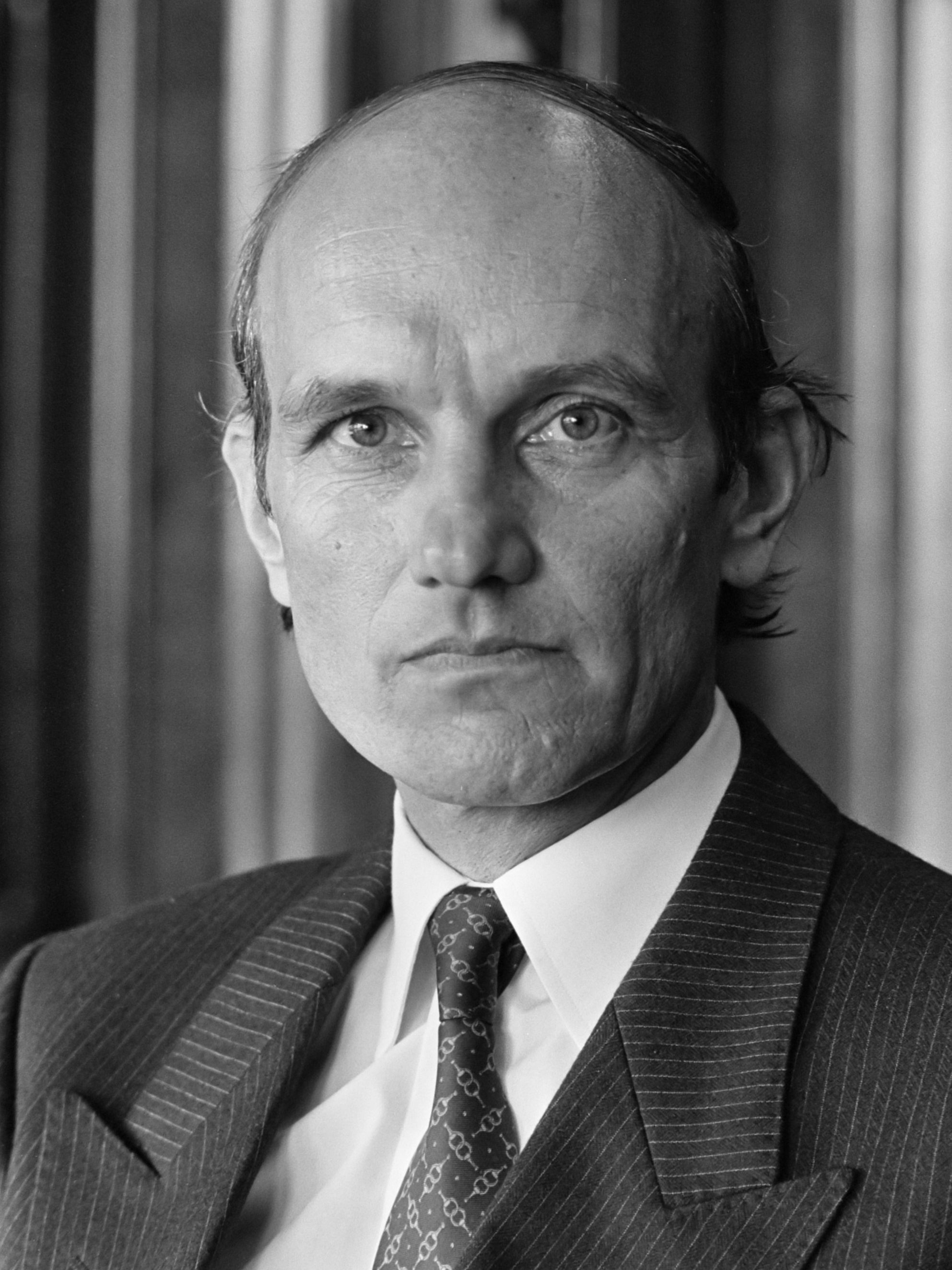
- Houben in 1987

Queen's Commissioner of North Brabant
- In office 22 April 1987 – 1 October 2003
- Preceded by: Dries van Agt
- Succeeded by: Hanja Maij-Weggen

Personal details
- Born: 19 February 1939 The Hague, Netherlands
- Died: 8 November 2023 (aged 84)

Frank Johannes Maria Houben (19 February 1939 – 8 November 2023) was a Dutch politician who was the Queen's Commissioner for the province of North Brabant between 22 April 1987 and 1 October 2003, when he retired after 16 years of service for Beatrix of the Netherlands. His successor was Hanja Maij-Weggen. Previously he had been mayor of Luyksgestel, Vessem, Wintelre en Knegsel, and Etten-Leur.

On 20 September 2003, the mayors of the province of North Brabant planted trees in Houben Forest as a tribute to his work. The Houben forest is located near Nemerlaer Castle in the municipality of Haaren in the province of North Brabant.

Houben attended the Radboud University Nijmegen and the University of Pittsburgh. He was married with four children. Houben died on 8 November 2023, at the age of 84.

== Sources ==
- (in Dutch) Parlement.com biography
