= Center for Arab-West Understanding =

Egypt-based think tank

The Center for Arab-West Understanding (CAWU) developed from the ideals of the Egyptian electronic magazine Arab-West Report. The request for Egyptian NGO status was filed in 2004 and obtained in January 2008. The Center is based in Cairo, Egypt.

The aim of CAWU is to foster a better understanding between the Arab world and other cultures by encouraging students, journalists, academics, religious leaders, and politicians to alter the manner in which they speak and write about people belonging to other cultures or religions, and helping them refrain from polemics, exaggerations and other distortions.

The Center is chaired by Sawsan Gabra Ayoub Khalil. Cornelis Hulsman is the Center's secretary general.

== CAWU's Goal ==
The center hopes to further understanding by applying the following methods: Helping to provide access to accurate, credible and reliable information, improving the public's understanding of the contemporary Islamic world in non-Muslim countries and vice versa, and encouraging accurate reporting and analyses on Arab-West cultural, religious and other key issues involving civil society, both in the Arab world and in the West.

== Activities ==
The center formulated in March 2008 a petition to the Dutch Parliament calling Geert Wilders' statements about Muslims and Islam 'provocative,' and calling on “all Dutch MP's to actively and effectively promote intercultural tolerance, dialogue and harmonious co-existence.” The petition was signed by prominent Muslim and Christian leaders in Egypt.

The center organized a visit of a delegation of Dutch church representatives and Muslim organizations in March 2008 to Egypt which was widely reported about in the Netherlands, asked Egyptian scholars to write reports explaining the Qur'anic texts Wilders highlighted and discussing the crisis on Egyptian TV and in public meetings at Cairo University.
