= Hans Hoogervorst =

Dutch politician (born 1956)

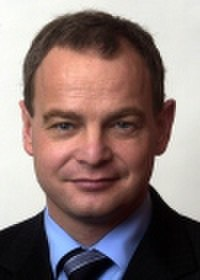
- Hoogervorst in 2005

Chairman of the International Accounting Standards Board
- In office 1 July 2011 – 30 June 2021
- Preceded by: Sir David Tweedie
- Succeeded by: Andreas Barckow

Chairman of the International Organization of Securities Commissions
- In office 9 June 2010 – 1 April 2011

Vice Chairman of the International Organization of Securities Commissions
- In office 29 May 2008 – 9 June 2010

Chairman of the Authority for the Financial Markets
- In office 15 September 2007 – 1 April 2011
- Preceded by: Arthur Docters van Leeuwen
- Succeeded by: Ronald Gerritse

Minister of Health, Welfare and Sport
- In office 27 May 2003 – 22 February 2007
- Prime Minister: Jan Peter Balkenende
- Preceded by: Aart Jan de Geus
- Succeeded by: Ab Klink

Minister of Economic Affairs
- In office 16 October 2002 – 27 May 2003
- Prime Minister: Jan Peter Balkenende
- Preceded by: Herman Heinsbroek
- Succeeded by: Laurens Jan Brinkhorst

Minister of Finance
- In office 22 July 2002 – 27 May 2003
- Prime Minister: Jan Peter Balkenende
- Preceded by: Gerrit Zalm
- Succeeded by: Gerrit Zalm

State Secretary for Social Affairs and Employment
- In office 3 August 1998 – 22 July 2002 Serving with Annelies Verstand
- Prime Minister: Wim Kok
- Preceded by: Frank de Grave
- Succeeded by: Mark Rutte; Philomena Bijlhout

Member of the House of Representatives
- In office 30 January 2003 – 27 May 2003
- In office 23 May 2002 – 22 July 2002
- In office 17 May 1994 – 3 August 1998
- Parliamentary group: People's Party for Freedom and Democracy

Personal details
- Born: Johannes Franciscus Hoogervorst; 19 April 1956 (age 70) Haarlem, Netherlands
- Party: People's Party for Freedom and Democracy (from 1986)
- Other political affiliations: Labour Party (1978–1983)
- Spouse: Marisa Polin (m. 1996)
- Children: 1 son
- Education: University of Amsterdam (Bachelor of Arts, Master of Arts); Johns Hopkins University (Master of Arts)
- Occupation: Politician · Civil servant · Economist · Businessman · Banker · Financial analyst · Financial adviser · Corporate director · Nonprofit director · Political consultant · Author
- Website: (in English) Chairman of the International Accounting Standards Board

Johannes Franciscus "Hans" Hoogervorst (born 19 April 1956) is a retired Dutch politician of the People's Party for Freedom and Democracy (VVD) and economist. He is the former chairman of the International Accounting Standards Board (IASB) from 1 July 2011 through 30 June 2021.

Hoogervorst attended a Gymnasium in Haarlem from June 1968 until June 1974 and applied at the University of Amsterdam in July 1974 majoring in Modern history and obtaining a Bachelor of Arts degree in June 1976 before graduating with a Master of Arts degree in July 1980. Hoogervorst applied at the Paul H. Nitze School of Advanced International Studies of the Johns Hopkins University in Baltimore, Maryland in March 1981 for a postgraduate education in International relations obtaining a Master of Arts degree in July 1983. Hoogervorst worked as a financial analyst at the National Bank of Washington (NBW) in Washington, D.C. from August 1983 until March 1986 and as a civil servant for the Ministry of Finance from March 1986 until September 1987. Hoogervorst worked as a political consultant for the People's Party for Freedom and Democracy from September 1987 until May 1994 and also as a speechwriter for the Leader of the People's Party for Freedom and Democracy Frits Bolkestein from April 1990 until May 1994.

Hoogervorst was elected as a Member of the House of Representatives after the election of 1994, taking office on 17 May 1994 serving as a frontbencher and spokesperson for Finances. After the election of 1998 Hoogervorst was appointed as State Secretary for Social Affairs and Employment in the Cabinet Kok II, taking office on 3 August 1998. The Cabinet Kok II resigned on 16 April 2002 following the conclusions of the NIOD report into the Srebrenica massacre during the Bosnian War and continued to serve in a demissionary capacity. After the election of 2002 Hoogervorst returned as a Member of the House of Representatives, taking office on 23 May 2002. Following the cabinet formation of 2002 Hoogervorst was appointed as Minister of Finance in the Cabinet Balkenende I, taking office on 22 July 2002. The Cabinet Balkenende I fell just four months later on 16 October 2002 and continued to serve in a demissionary capacity with Hoogervorst appointed as Minister of Economic Affairs dual serving in both positions. After the election of 2003 Hoogervorst again returned as a Member of the House of Representatives, taking office on 30 January 2003. Following the cabinet formation of 2003 Hoogervorst was appointed as Minister of Health, Welfare and Sport in the Cabinet Balkenende II, taking office on 27 May 2003. The Cabinet Balkenende II fell on 30 June 2006 and continued to serve in a demissionary capacity until it was replaced by the caretaker Cabinet Balkenende III with Hoogervorst remaining as Minister of Health, Welfare and Sport, taking office on 7 July 2006. In August 2006 Hoogervorst announced that he wouldn't stand for the election of 2006 but did serve as campaign manager for that election. The Cabinet Balkenende III was replaced by the Cabinet Balkenende IV following the cabinet formation of 2006 on 22 February 2007.

Hoogervorst semi-retired from national politics and became active in the public sector, in August 2007 he was nominated as chairman of the executive board of the Authority for the Financial Markets (AFM), taking office on 15 September 2007. In May 2008 Hoogervorst was nominated as vice chairman of the supervisory board of the International Organization of Securities Commissions (IOSCO), taking office on 29 May 2008. In June 2010 Hoogervorst was elected as chairman of the supervisory board of the International Organization of Securities Commissions, taking office on 9 June 2010. In June 2011 Hoogervorst was nominated as the chairman of the executive board of the International Accounting Standards Board (IASB), he resigned as chairman of the Authority for the Financial Markets and chairman of the International Organization of Securities Commissions the same day he was installed as chairman of the International Accounting Standards Board, taking office on 1 July 2011.

== Biography ==
=== Early life ===
After completing his secondary education, he studied history at the University of Amsterdam, graduating in 1981. He then went on to obtain a Master of Arts degree in international relations from Johns Hopkins University SAIS in Washington, D.C. in 1983.

From 1983 to 1986 Hoogervorst worked as an international banking officer with the National Bank of Washington (Washington, D.C.) and from 1986 to 1987 as a policy officer for international monetary affairs at the Dutch Ministry of Finance. From 1988 to 1994 he was a policy assistant on finance to the People's Party for Freedom and Democracy (VVD) parliamentary party in the House of Representatives and from 1994 to 1998 a Member of Parliament.

=== Politics ===
From 3 August 1998, Hoogervorst was State Secretary for Social Affairs and Employment in the second Kok government. On 22 July 2002 he was appointed minister of finance in the first Balkenende government. From 16 October 2002 he was also responsible for the Dutch Ministry of Economic Affairs. On 27 May 2003 he was appointed Minister of Health, Welfare and Sports in the second Balkenende government. In this position, Hoogervorst introduced a basic health insurance policy, mandatory for all registered inhabitants, but executed by private insurers.

In 2007 Hoogervorst succeeded Arthur Docters van Leeuwen as director of AFM, the Dutch financial market supervisory organization.

On 1 July 2011 he became chairman of the IASB upon the retirement of Sir David Tweedie. He completed his 10 year term on 30 June 2021 and was succeeded by Andreas Barckow.

Hoogervorst faced many challenges as the IASB chairman. For instance, countries such as the U.S. and Japan had not yet adopted IFRS.

== Decorations ==
Honours
Ribbon bar	Honour	Country	Date	Comment
	Grand Officer of the Order of Leopold II	Belgium	15 May 2005	
	Officer of the Order of Orange-Nassau	Netherlands	11 April 2007	

Political offices
Preceded by Frank de Grave	State Secretary for Social; Affairs and Employment; 1998–2002; Served alongside: Annelies Verstand	Succeeded by Mark Rutte
Preceded by Frank de Grave	State Secretary for Social; Affairs and Employment; 1998–2002; Served alongside: Annelies Verstand	Succeeded by Philomena Bijlhout
Preceded by Gerrit Zalm	Minister of Finance; 2002–2003	Succeeded by Gerrit Zalm
Preceded by Herman Heinsbroek	Minister of Economic Affairs; 2002–2003	Succeeded by Laurens Jan Brinkhorst
Preceded by Aart Jan de Geus	Minister of Health, Welfare and Sport; 2003–2007	Succeeded by Ab Klink
Civic offices
Preceded by Arthur Docters van Leeuwen	Chairman of the Executive Board of the Authority for the Financial Markets; 2007–2011	Succeeded by Ronald Gerritse
Diplomatic posts
Unknown	Vice Chairman of the Supervisory board of the International Organization of Securities Commissions; 2008–2010	Unknown
Unknown	Chairman of the Supervisory board of the International Organization of Securities Commissions; 2010–2011	Unknown
Preceded by Sir David Tweedie	Chairman of the Executive Board of the International Accounting; Standards Board; 2011–present	Incumbent
