= Laurens Jan Brinkhorst =

Dutch politician & diplomat (born 1937)

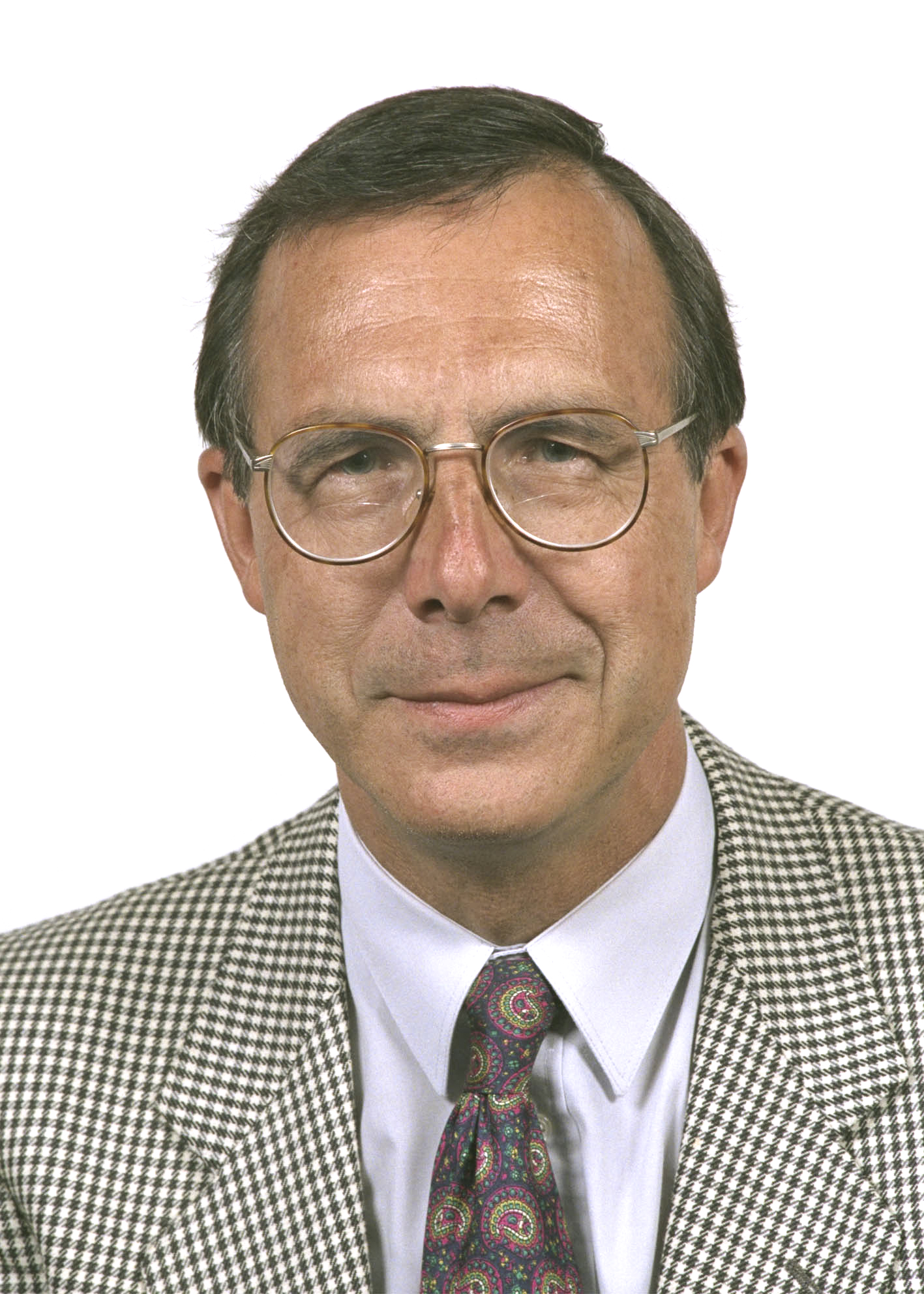
- Brinkhorst in 1994

Deputy Prime Minister
- In office 31 March 2005 – 3 July 2006 Serving with Gerrit Zalm
- Prime Minister: Jan Peter Balkenende
- Preceded by: Thom de Graaf
- Succeeded by: Gerrit Zalm

Minister of Economic Affairs
- In office 27 May 2003 – 3 July 2006
- Prime Minister: Jan Peter Balkenende
- Preceded by: Hans Hoogervorst
- Succeeded by: Gerrit Zalm (Ad interim)

Minister of Agriculture, Nature and Fisheries
- In office 9 June 1999 – 22 July 2002
- Prime Minister: Wim Kok
- Preceded by: Klaas de Vries (Ad interim)
- Succeeded by: Cees Veerman

Member of the European Parliament
- In office 19 July 1994 – 8 June 1999
- Parliamentary group: European Liberal Democrat and Reform Party
- Constituency: Netherlands

Ambassador of the European Union to Japan
- In office 1 December 1982 – 1 January 1987
- Preceded by: Leslie Fielding
- Succeeded by: Dries van Agt

Leader of the Democrats 66
- In office 8 September 1982 – 11 November 1982
- Preceded by: Jan Terlouw
- Succeeded by: Maarten Engwirda

Parliamentary leader in the House of Representatives
- In office 11 September 1981 – 11 November 1982
- Preceded by: Jan Terlouw
- Succeeded by: Maarten Engwirda
- Parliamentary group: Democrats 66

Member of the House of Representatives
- In office 8 June 1977 – 11 November 1982
- Parliamentary group: Democrats 66

State Secretary for Foreign Affairs
- In office 11 May 1973 – 8 September 1977 Serving with Pieter Kooijmans
- Prime Minister: Joop den Uyl
- Preceded by: Tjerk Westerterp
- Succeeded by: Durk van der Mei

Personal details
- Born: Laurens Jan Brinkhorst; 18 March 1937 (age 89) Zwolle, Netherlands
- Party: Democrats 66 (from 1966)
- Spouse: Jantien Heringa (m. 1960)
- Children: 2, including Princess Laurentien of the Netherlands
- Relatives: Prince Constantijn (son-in-law)
- Education: Leiden University (LL.B., LL.M.); Columbia University (B.Soc.Sc, MSSc)
- Occupation: Politician · Diplomat · Civil servant · Jurist · Lawyer · Researcher · Nonprofit director · Lobbyist · Activist · Author · Professor

Laurens Jan Brinkhorst (born 18 March 1937) is a Dutch retired politician and diplomat of the Democrats 66 (D66) party.

== Early life and education ==
Laurens-Jan Brinkhorst was born in the city of Zwolle. His parents were Marius Jacobus Brinkhorst (1902–1943) and Françoise Laurence Wilhelmina Holboom (1901–1981). After getting his high school diploma (gymnasium-B-diploma in Dutch) he studied law at the University of Leiden, where he obtained his LL.M. degree in 1959. He also received a M.A. degree in Public Law and Government from Columbia University in New York City. Afterwards he worked at Shearman & Sterling in New York City.

Brinkhorst attended the Christian Gymnasium Sorghvliet in The Hague from June 1945 until June 1954 and applied at the Leiden University in June 1954, majoring in law. He obtained a Bachelor of Laws degree in June 1956 before graduating with a Master of Laws degree in July 1959. Brinkhorst applied at the Columbia University in New York City in August 1959 for a postgraduate education in political science and obtained a Bachelor of Social Science degree before graduating with a Master of Social Science in September 1961. Brinkhorst worked as a paralegal at Shearman & Sterling in New York City from September 1961 until December 1962. Brinkhorst worked as a researcher at the Leiden University from December 1962 until January 1967 and as an associate professor of international law at the Leiden University from April 1965 until January 1967 and as a professor of international law, international relations and European law at the University of Groningen from January 1967 until 11 May 1973.

== Career in politics and academia ==
Brinkhorst served on the Provincial-Council of Groningen from July 1970 until August 1971. After the election of 1972 Brinkhorst was appointed as State Secretary for Foreign Affairs in the Cabinet Den Uyl, taking office on 19 December 1977. The Cabinet Den Uyl fell on 22 March 1977 after four years of tensions in the coalition and continued to serve in a demissionary capacity. Brinkhorst was elected as a Member of the House of Representatives after the election of 1977, taking office on 8 June 1977 but he was still serving in the cabinet and because of dualism customs in the constitutional convention of Dutch politics he couldn't serve a dual mandate he subsequently resigned as State Secretary on 8 September 1977.

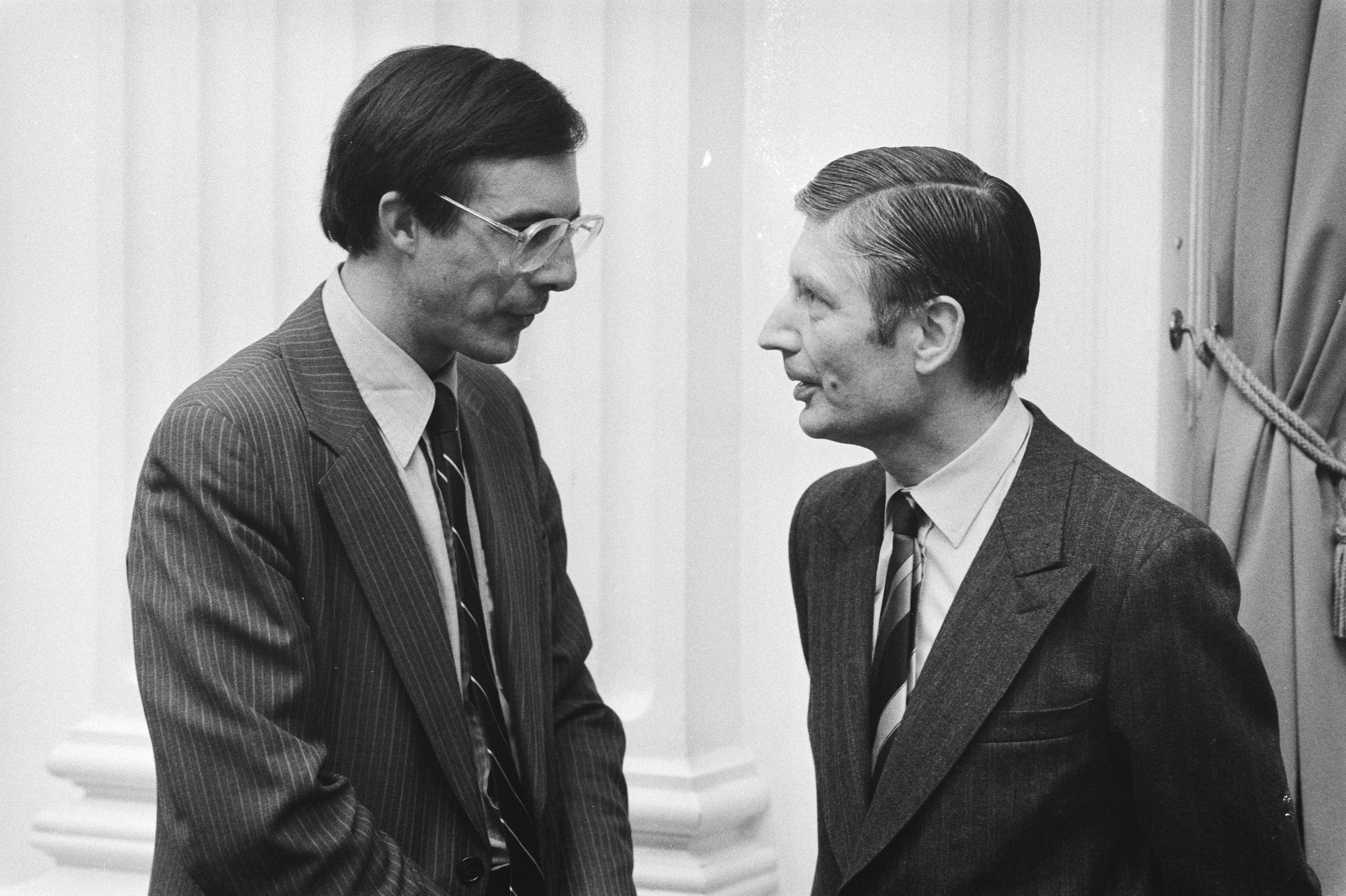
Laurens Jan Brinkhorst and Prime Minister Dries van Agt in the House of Representatives on 3 February 1981.

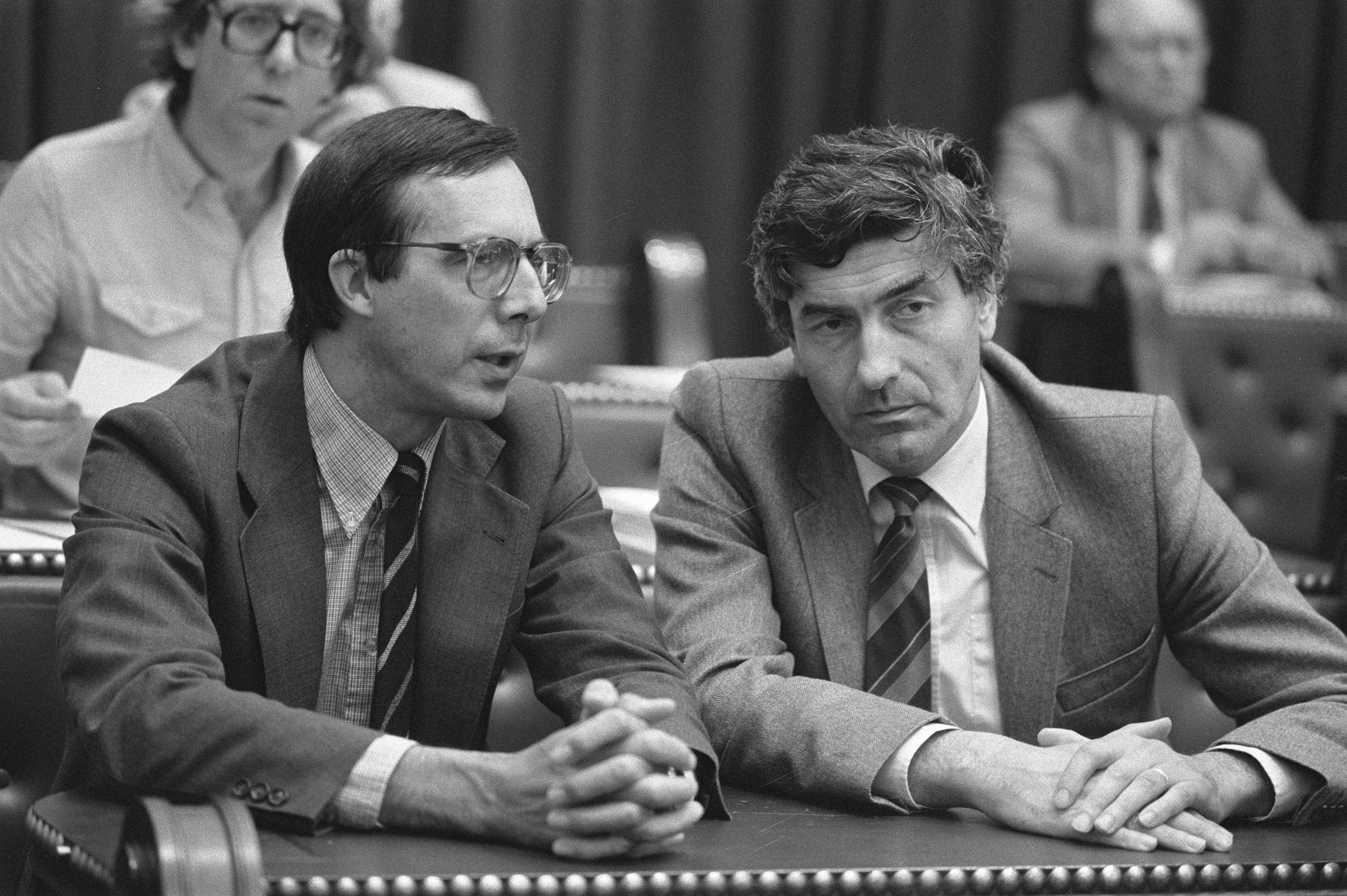
Parliamentary leaders Laurens Jan Brinkhorst and Ruud Lubbers in the House of Representatives on 9 June 1982.

In 1977 he was again a member of the Second Chamber of the Dutch parliament for D66 and in 1981 became the leader of his party in parliament. From 1983 to 1987 he was Ambassador of the European Community in Japan. After the election of 1981 the Leader of the Democrats 66 and Parliamentary leader of the Democrats 66 in the House of Representatives Jan Terlouw was appointed as Deputy Prime Minister and Minister of Economic Affairs in the Cabinet Van Agt II and Brinkhorst was selected as his successor as Parliamentary leader in the House of Representatives on 11 September 1981. After the Leader of the Democrats 66 Terlouw announced that he was stepping down as Leader following a big loss in the election of 1982 the Democrats 66 leadership appointed Brinkhorst as his successor on 8 September 1982. In October 1982 Brinkhorst was nominated as Ambassador of the European Union to Japan, he resigned as Leader and as Parliamentary leader and as a Member of the House of Representatives on 11 November 1982 and was installed as Ambassador, taking office on 1 December 1982. In December 1986 Brinkhorst was nominated as Director-General of the Scientific Committee on Consumer Safety of the European Commission, he resigned as Ambassador the same day he was installed as Director-General, serving from 1 January 1987 until his resignation 19 July 1994.

Brinkhorst was elected as a Member of the European Parliament after the European Parliamentary election of 1994, taking office on 19 July 1994. Brinkhorst was appointed as Minister of Agriculture, Nature and Fisheries in the Cabinet Kok II following the resignation of Haijo Apotheker, taking office on 9 June 1999. In February 2002 Brinkhorst announced that he wouldn't stand for the election of 2002. The Cabinet Kok II resigned on 16 April 2002 following the conclusions of the NIOD report into the Srebrenica massacre during the Bosnian War and continued to serve in a demissionary capacity. The Cabinet Kok II was replaced by the Cabinet Balkenende I following the cabinet formation of 2002 on 22 July 2002. Brinkhorst semi-retired from active politics and became active in the private sector and public sector and worked as a senior legal advisor at NautaDutilh in Brussels from August 2002 until May 2003 and served as a distinguished professor of Governmental Studies and International relations at the Tilburg University from 1 December 2002 until 27 May 2003.

In 1987 he became a correspondent of the Royal Netherlands Academy of Arts and Sciences. Between 1987 and 1994 Brinkhorst continued his service at the European Commission as Director-General for Environmental Affairs and Nuclear Safety. In 1994 Brinkhorst became a member of the European Parliament, serving there until 1999.

Brinkhorst was also a member of the Provinciale Staten (the provincial parliament) of the province of Groningen for D66, a member of the board of advice of the World Resources Institute in Washington DC, a member of the board of governors of the Nederlands Economisch Instituut (Dutch Economical Institute), a professor by special appointment of international environmental law at the University of Leiden, a member of the Board of Directors of the Salzburg Seminar, a member of the Board of Directors of the International Institute of Sustainable Development, and a professor (on a temporary basis) of international environmental law at the university of Lausanne.

On 8 June 1999 he became the minister of agriculture, environmental control and fishery in the cabinet Kok-II. Afterwards (2002) he became an Adviser of European Affairs at NautaDulith in Brussels and was awarded a professorship in transnational and European Governance at the university of Tilburg.

After the election of 2003 Brinkhorst was appointed as Minister of Economic Affairs in the Cabinet Balkenende II, taking office on 27 May 2003. Brinkhorst was also appointed as Deputy Prime Minister following the resignation of Thom de Graaf, taking office on 31 March 2005. The Cabinet Balkenende II fell on 30 June 2006 after the Democrats 66 had lost confidence in the functioning of Minister of Integration and Asylum Affairs Rita Verdonk and continued to serve in a demissionary capacity until the Democrats 66 cabinet members resigned on 3 July 2006. Shortly thereafter Brinkhorst announced his retirement from national politics and that he wouldn't stand for the election of 2006. After the electoral defeat of D66 he became a minister of economic affairs in the second Balkenende cabinet. Brinkhorst, as well as Alexander Pechtold, resigned from his minister post after the second Balkenende cabinet lost the confidence of parliament on 29 June 2006. The next day, Balkenende offered the resignation of the full cabinet to the Dutch Queen.

He is a Senior Network Member at the European Leadership Network (ELN).

== Personal life ==
On 26 August 1960, Brinkhorst married Jantien Heringa (born 2 February 1935 in Voorburg), daughter of Ewardus Heringa (The Hague, 14 November 1904 - The Hague, 30 November 1988) and wife (m. Utrecht, 4 August 1930) Petronela Johanna Roskam (Utrecht, 20 August 1905 - The Hague, 19 December 1991). Brinkhorst and Heringa are the parents of Marius Brinkhorst (born 9 February 1964) and the Dutch princess Laurentien (born 25 May 1966), who married Prince Constantijn in 2001.

Brinkhorst retired after spending 33 years in national politics and became active in the public sector and occupied numerous seats as a nonprofit director on several boards of directors and supervisory boards (Institute of International Relations Clingendael, Energy Research Centre, Netherlands Atlantic Association, Nuclear Research and Consultancy Group, Organisation for Scientific Research, Institute for Advanced Study and the Society for Statistics and Operations Research) and served as a diplomat and lobbyist for several economic delegations on behalf of the government and as an advocate and activist for Human rights, European integration, Environmentalism, Sustainable development and Climate change. Brinkhorst also served as a distinguished professor of Governmental studies, International relations, International law and European law at the Leiden University from 1 November 2006 until 1 November 2011 and a distinguished visiting professor of International relations and Environmental law at the University of Lausanne from 1 February 2007 until 1 February 2008.

== Decorations ==
=== National ===
- Grand Officer of the Order of Orange-Nassau (11 April 2007)
- Officer of the Order of Orange-Nassau (10 December 2002)
- Knight of the Order of the Netherlands Lion (11 April 1978)

=== Foreign ===
- Austria: Grand Decoration of Honour in Gold of the Decoration of Honour for Services to the Republic of Austria (18 May 2004)
- Belgium: Grand Cross of the Order of Leopold II (15 May 1988)
- Denmark: Grand Cross of the Order of the Dannebrog (31 August 2003)
- France: Officer of the Order of Legion of Honour (4 July 2010)
- Germany: Commander of the Order of Merit of the Federal Republic of Germany (1 September 2004)
- Italy: Knight Grand Cross of the Order of Merit of the Italian Republic (30 April 1985)
- Japan: Grand Cordon of the Order of the Rising Sun (1 July 2005)
- Luxembourg: Commander of the Order of the Oak Crown (25 January 1996)
- Poland: Commander of the Order of Polonia Restituta (6 May 2005)
- Spain: Commander of the Order of Isabella the Catholic (5 December 2000)

== Honorary degrees ==
- Netherlands – Tilburg University: Law (5 July 2003)

== Electoral history ==
Electoral history of Laurens Jan Brinkhorst
Year	Body	Party	Pos.	Votes	Result		Ref.
Year	Body	Party	Pos.	Votes	Party seats	Individual	Ref.
2021	House of Representatives	Democrats 66	73 (Note: Only participated as lijstduwer in the electoral district The Hague.)	19	24	Lost	

== Notes ==
Party political offices
Preceded by Jan Terlouw	Parliamentary leader of the Democrats 66 in the House of Representatives; 1981–1982	Succeeded by Maarten Engwirda
Preceded by Jan Terlouw	Leader of the Democrats 66; 1982	Succeeded by Maarten Engwirda
Political offices
Preceded by Tjerk Westerterp	State Secretary for Foreign Affairs; 1973–1977; Served alongside: Pieter Kooijmans	Succeeded by Durk van der Mei
Preceded by Klaas de Vries; Ad interim	Minister of Agriculture, Nature and Fisheries; 1999–2002	Succeeded by Cees Veerman
Preceded by Hans Hoogervorst	Minister of Economic Affairs; 2003–2006	Succeeded by Gerrit Zalm; Ad interim
Preceded by Thom de Graaf	Deputy Prime Minister; 2005–2006; Served alongside: Gerrit Zalm	Succeeded by Gerrit Zalm
Diplomatic posts
Preceded by Leslie Fielding	Ambassador of the European; Union to Japan; 1982–1987	Succeeded by Dries van Agt
