= 2002 Dutch cabinet formation =

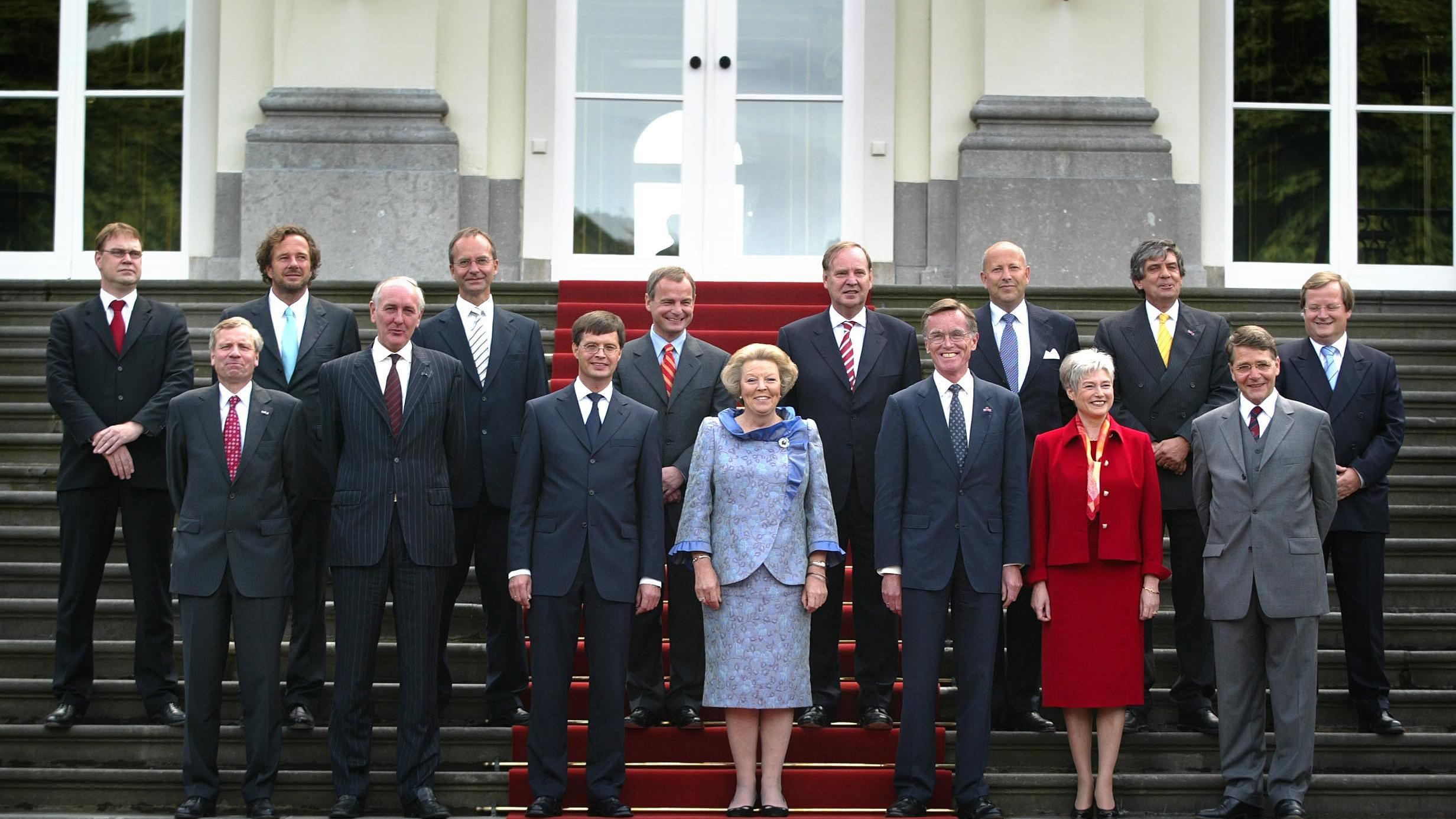
The bordes scene of the First Balkenende cabinet at Huis ten Bosch on 22 July 2002 with queen Beatrix in the middle.

After the Dutch general election of 15 May 2002, a cabinet formation took place in Netherlands. This resulted in the First Balkenende cabinet on 22 July 2002. The coalition was formed by Christian Democratic Appeal (CDA), People's Party for Freedom and Democracy (VVD) and the Pim Fortuyn List (LPF).

Informateur Piet Hein Donner was tasked with exploring options for coalitions and later with facilitating the negotiations. At first, the VVD was hesitant to join the cabinet, but agreed to negotiations after a week. Internal problems of the new LPF at times hindered the negotiations. During the search for Ministers and State Secretaries under formateur Jan Peter Balkenende, the LPF had a harder time finding suitable candidates. Despite taking place shortly after the murder on 6 May of LPF's party leader Pim Fortuyn, the formation went relatively calm and quick.

== Background ==
Since 1994, the purple cabinets – first Kok cabinet and second Kok cabinet – had governed under the chairmanship of Prime Minister Wim Kok. The cabinet fell due to the cabinet crisis over the Srebrenica massacre in April 2002, just before the elections a month later, the date of which remained unchanged.

As early as August 2001, Kok had indicated that he was no longer available for the PvdA party leadership position. He was succeeded by Ad Melkert. Hans Dijkstal was party leader of the coalition partner VVD. Party leader of the smallest purple party, D66, was Thom de Graaf. In the largest opposition party - the CDA - Jan Peter Balkenende became party leader. Paul Rosenmöller was party leader of GroenLinks.

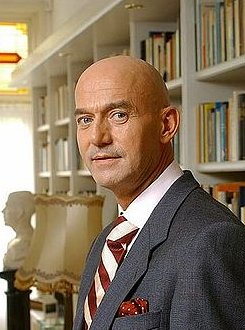
Pim Fortuyn on 4 May 2002

Publicist Pim Fortuyn became party leader of Liveable Netherlands. In his book De puinhopen van acht jaar paars (English: The Wreckage of Eight Years of Purple) he described his criticism of the government's policy, in which, according to him, the public sector had been neglected. He was also critical of Islam, which he called a 'backward culture', and of migration. These latter positions led to a break with Leefbaar Nederland in February 2002, after which he founded his own party under time pressure, Lijst Pim Fortuyn. Livable Rotterdam, of which he was still party leader, managed to become the largest in the municipal elections of March 2002 in Rotterdam.

While PvdA and VVD scored well in the polls until early 2002, this declined in favor of LPF and CDA. PvdA, GL and D66 turned against Fortuyn, and accused him of taking a dangerous and extreme right course. The VVD was also critical, but also wanted became more critical of asylum to compete for votes. The CDA, on the other hand, had agreed a non-aggression pact with Fortuyn in November 2001 and turned against the multicultural society.

The campaign came to a standstill when on 6 May Fortuyn was murdered at the Media Park in Hilversum by environmental activist Volkert van der Graaf. The Netherlands reacted with shock. Supporters of Fortuyn went to the Binnenhof, where as the evening progressed they accused Melkert, Kok and Rosenmöller of being murderers. The decision whether the elections should go ahead was left to the LPF. They chose to allow the elections to go ahead, "because Pim would have wanted it that way." All parties stopped their campaigns.

=== Election results ===
Composition of the elected House: SP: 9 GL: 10 PvdA: 23 D66: 7 VVD: 24 CDA: 43 SGP: 2 CU: 4 LN: 2 LPF: 26

The purple parties lost significantly in the election: PvdA from 45 to 23, VVD from 38 to 24 and D66 from 14 to 7. The LPF entered the House with 26 seats; never before had a newcomer obtained so many seats. The largest parliamentary group was the CDA with 43 seats. Following the results, both Melkert and Dijkstal resigned as party leaders, who were replaced by Jeltje van Nieuwenhoven and Gerrit Zalm respectively. The LPF-group chose Mat Herben as party leader from five candidates.

== Informateur Donner ==
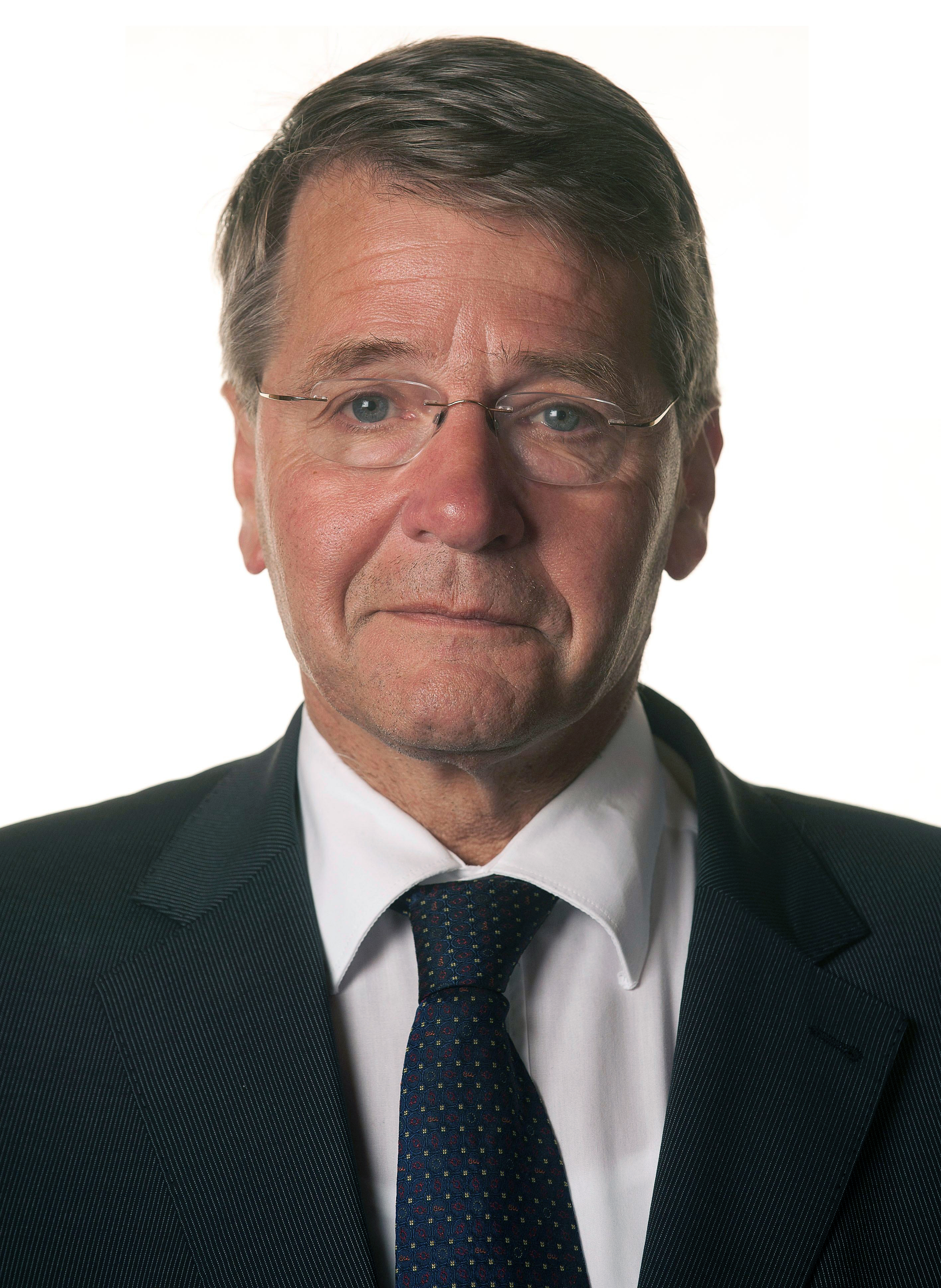
Informateur Piet Hein Donner.

In the run-up to the elections, there had been calls for a debate on the appointment of an informateur, but due to the circumstances there was ultimately no majority in favor of this. Queen Beatrix was then visited by her usual advisors and the parliamentary group leaders. Balkenende advised appointing a CDA informateur and had previously hinted at cooperation with the LPF. Herben also supported a CDA informateur for negotiations with CDA, LPF and VVD. GroenLinks, D66, SP, ChristenUnie also considered a coalition of CDA, LPF and VVD the obvious option. Zalm supported a CDA informateur, but did not want VVD to join a cabinet due to the electoral loss. On 17 May, Beatrix appointed Piet Hein Donner (CDA) informateur. He was assisted by two advisors, including Paul Huijts, and Government Information Service-chief director Eef Brouwers.

Zalm held on to his blockade. At the same time, there were signals that the VVD was preparing for cabinet participation. For example, the parliamentary group meetings were already being held with people lower on the list who would enter the House if they were to join the cabinet. On 24 May, after deliberation with his group, Zalm finally agreed to negotiations.

=== Negotiations ===
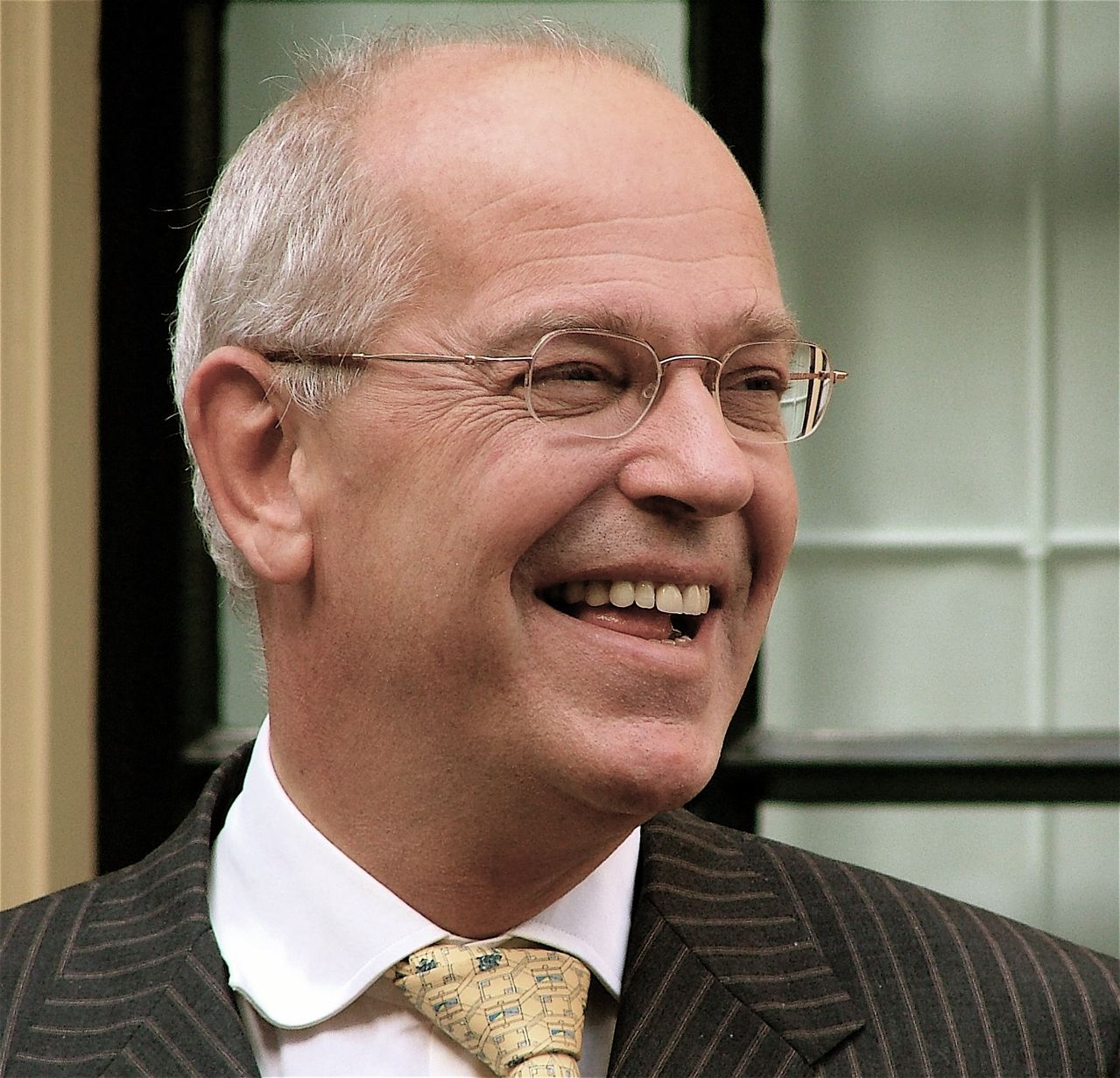
VVD negotiator Gerrit Zalm.

The subsequent negotiations took place in a good atmosphere, with a lot of investment in personal relationships. Herben's goal was to integrate the LPF into Dutch politics, while Balkenende and Zalm wanted to bind the LPF to the system. The parliamentary groups were less involved in the negotiations than had been usual since 1982, although the negotiators each had their own formation team that they consulted. Herben in particular was later accused of working solo.

As newcomer, the LPF was still searching during that period, both in terms of political positions and organisation. For example, confusion arose about the asylum position just before the negotiations. Herben announced in the Volkskrant that he was willing to accept ten thousand rejected asylum seekerss, while Hoogendijk argued in Buitenhof for a general pardon, which amounted to a hundred thousand. Both said this was what Fortuyn had wanted. Herben eventually managed to reassure the CDA and VVD that a general pardon was not their desire. In addition, Herben constantly had to leave the negotiations to resolve arguments within his parliamentary group.

The parties quickly reached an agreement on many issues, such as a more restrictive asylum policy, abolition of the increase in excise tax on car fuel, limitation of make-work jobs and the introduction of the elected mayor. They arrived at an austerity package of 6.82 billion euros. The most difficult topics were saved until the end: introduction of a new healthcare system and revision of the work disability insurance. CDA and VVD were mainly opposed to each other on these issues. On 19 June, negotiators also managed to reach agreement on these topics. Because of the refreshments served, this was called the 'toasted sandwich agreement'.

=== Coalition agreement ===
The draft agreement was shared with the parliamentary groups on 25 June. The VVD was especially satisfied; much was in line with their election manifesto. However, the former purple ministers were bothered by the title 'Restored confidence'. All groups submitted a number of amendments. The LPF tried at the last minute to establish a Ministry of Security, which would house all police responsibilities, but this was rejected. Ultimately, on 3 July, the parliamentary groups agreed to the agreement entitled 'Working on trust. A matter of tackling it'. On 4 July, the House of Representatives held a debate in which the agreement was discussed. Although no opposition motions received a majority during that debate, negotiators increased the budget for police training. Afterwards, Donner submitted his final report to Beatrix.

== Formateur Balkenende ==
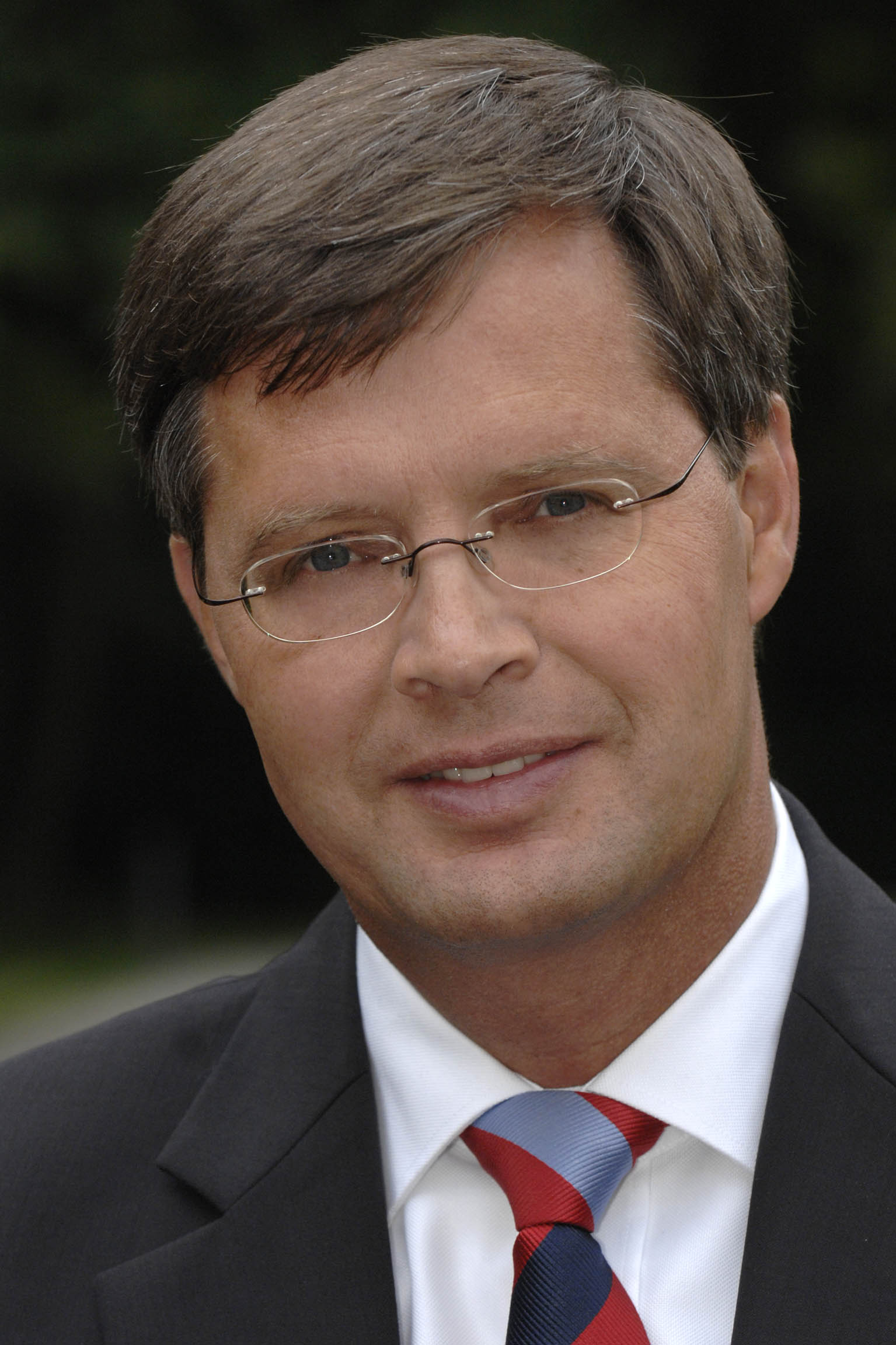
Formateur Jan Peter Balkenende, 2006.

On Donner's advice, Balkenende was appointed formateur on 4 July, after which Maria van der Hoeven negotiated on behalf of CDA. The negotiators quickly agreed on the number of ministerial posts per party: CDA 6, LPF 4 and VVD 4, with the ministerial post for Development Aid becoming a State Secretary. Distributing the posts proved more difficult and led to annoyance. LPF wanted Finance – while that ministry had actually already been given to VVD – as well as Interior, Justice or a heavy ministership of Asylum and Immigration. LPF even threatened to drop out.

Ultimately, on 10 July, negotiators reached a compromise in which LPF was given the ministership of Immigration and Integration. However, the LPF-group still felt under-resourced and sent Herben back to the negotiating table. LPF MPs João Varela, Joost Eerdmans and Harry Wijnschenk even went to the negotiating table themselves to once again advocate a Ministry of Security. The CDA, on the other hand, threatened to quit. Ultimately, VVD agreed to an LPF state secretary for police at the Ministry of the Interior.

=== Personnel ===
Before the elections, Fortuyn and former VVD leader Hans Wiegel discussed Wiegel becoming prime minister if the LPF would become the largest party. Herben reiterated at the start of the formation that it was not certain that Balkenende would become prime minister and again suggested Wiegel. However, during the formation, Herben supported Balkenende for prime minister. Selecting ministers was fairly easy for the CDA. At the VVD, Zalm wanted a number of women in the cabinet, but the requested women all declined, leaving CDA member Van der Hoeven as the only female minister. LPF and CDA had indicated that they did not want any ministers from the purple cabinet, but Zalm still retained three ministers from the previous cabinet.

For LPF finding ministers was more complicated. They could not draw on experienced administrators and politicians and did not want to promote MPs to cabinet. The preliminary search by Mickey Huibregtsen and Albert de Booij was ignored by the parliamentary group. Transport economist Hugo Roos turned down the position of Minister of Transport, Public Works and Water Management because he did not consider himself suitable for politics. Herben was prepared to abandon the intention not to transfer MPs for Vic Bonke, but he refused for personal reasons. Herben spoke with Ahmed Aboutaleb, board member of the institute for multicultural issues Forum, but Aboutaleb refused because his views were too far removed from LPF and later joined PvdA. For the State Secretariat for Emancipation, Herben eventually found Philomena Bijlhout, who, with her Surinamese origins, became the first immigrant cabinet member.

Impatiently, Balkenende issued an ultimatum to the LPF for 16 July, for which Herben submitted a list just in time. Between 17 and 20 July, Balkenende met with the candidate ministers. Special attention was paid to the separation of personal and commercial interests, because mainly LPF ministers came from the business community. On 22 July, the constitutive deliberation took place, during which the Minister of the Interior claimed full responsibility for the police, despite previous commitments to the LPF. That same day, Balkenende handed in his report to Beatrix and the ministers were sworn in.

== Aftermath ==
Seven hours after being sworn in, Bijlhout resigned – a record – because she had concealed that she had been a member of a people's militia of Desi Bouterse in Suriname at the time of the December murders. On 26 July, Balkenende delivered the government statement. Despite the relatively smooth formation, the cabinet fell after just three months due to incessant conflicts within the LPF.
