= Jan Odink =

Dutch politician

Member of the House of Representatives
- In office 15 May 2002 – 2003

State Secretary for Agriculture, Nature and Fisheries
- In office 22 July 2002 – 27 May 2003
- Prime Minister: Jan Peter Balkenende
- Preceded by: Geke Faber

Personal details
- Born: Berend Odink; 18 August 1944 Zwolle, Netherlands
- Died: 29 April 2018 (aged 73) Mahe, Seychelles
- Party: Pim Fortuyn List
- Other political affiliations: People's Party for Freedom and Democracy
- Occupation: Politician, conservationist

Berend Jan Odink (18 August 1944 – 29 April 2018) was a Dutch politician and nature conservationist who served as an MP in the House of Representatives for the Pim Fortuyn List (LPF) from 2002 to 2003. He served as Secretary of Ttate for Ministry of Agriculture, Nature Conservation and Fisheries in the first Balkenende cabinet.

Odink studied agriculture at Wageningen University and worked for the Product Board for Livestock and Meat. He was a member of the People's Party for Freedom and Democracy but left the party as he felt it had lost its original identity after collaborating in the purple coalition with the PvdA under Wim Kok. He subsequently joined the Pim Fortuyn List. Odink was elected to the Dutch House of Representatives in 2002 for the LPF. Odink retired from politics following the 2003 election. He died in 2018 in the Seychelles.
