= First Balkenende cabinet =

Cabinet of the Netherlands, 2002 to 2003

- Cabinet of the Netherlands

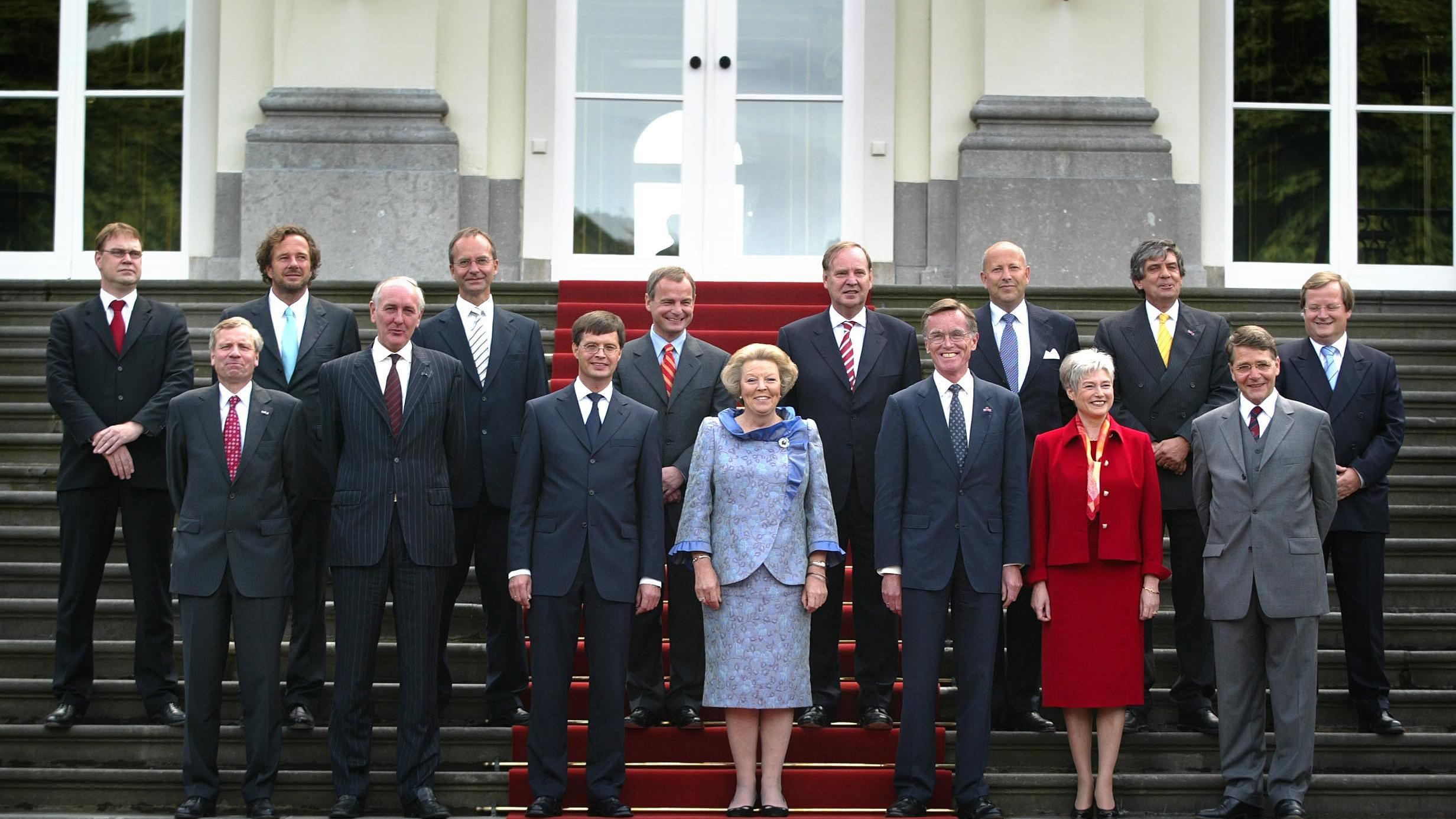
- The installation of the first Balkenende cabinet on 22 July 2002
- Date formed: 22 July 2002
- Date dissolved: 27 May 2003 (Demissionary from 16 October 2002)

People and organisations
- Monarch: Queen Beatrix
- Prime Minister: Jan Peter Balkenende
- Deputy Prime Minister: Eduard Bomhoff (2002); Johan Remkes; Roelf de Boer (2002–2003)
- No. of ministers: 14
- Ministers removed: 3
- Total no. of members: 14
- Member party: Christian Democratic Appeal (CDA); Pim Fortuyn List (LPF); People's Party for Freedom and Democracy (VVD)
- Status in legislature: Right-wing majority government

History
- Incoming formation: 2002 formation
- Outgoing formation: 2003 formation
- Election: 2002 election
- Outgoing election: 2003 election
- Legislature terms: 2002–2003
- Predecessor: Second Kok cabinet
- Successor: Second Balkenende cabinet

The first Balkenende cabinet was the executive branch of the Netherlands government from 22 July 2002 until 27 May 2003. The cabinet was formed by the Christian-democratic Christian Democratic Appeal (CDA), the nationalistic Pim Fortuyn List (LPF) and the conservative-liberal People's Party for Freedom and Democracy (VVD) after the election of 2002. The cabinet was a right-wing coalition and had a substantial majority in the House of Representatives with Christian Democratic Leader Jan Peter Balkenende serving as Prime Minister. Prominent economist Eduard Bomhoff served as Deputy Prime Minister and Minister of Health, Welfare and Sport, while prominent Liberal politician Johan Remkes served as Deputy Prime Minister and Minister of the Interior and Kingdom Relations.

The cabinet served during the early unstable 2000s. Domestically, it had to deal with the fallout of the assassination of Pim Fortuyn, and internationally, with the start of the war on terror. The cabinet suffered several major internal conflicts including multiple cabinet resignations. The internal conflicts between the cabinet members of the Pim Fortuyn List led to the fall of the cabinet just 87 days into its term on 16 October 2002 and it continued in a demissionary capacity until it was replaced following the election of 2003.

== Formation ==
Composition of the cabinet in relation to the rest of the legislature

On 17 May 2002 Queen Beatrix appointed Member of the Council of State Piet Hein Donner (CDA) as "informateur", to investigate the possibilities for a new government. A coalition between CDA, LPF and VVD was established relatively quickly, despite some initial resistance by the VVD. By 4 July a detailed coalition agreement had been drawn up and the Queen appointed Jan Peter Balkenende, the lijsttrekker for the CDA, as formateur to form a new cabinet. The cabinet was named on 16 July and was sworn in on 22 July. The first Balkenende cabinet comprised 14 ministers and 14 State Secretaries, with each post allocated to one of the coalition parties. Each of the ministers headed a department, with the exception of one "minister without a portfolio" to deal with "foreigners policy and integration", accommodated by the Ministry of Justice.

== Term ==
=== Incidents and scandals ===
The first Balkenende cabinet was very unstable from the beginning. Elections had been held in the very recent aftermath of the assassination of Pim Fortuyn, the leader of the newly established Pim Fortuyn List. Emotions in the Netherlands had run very high. The LPF was catapulted into enormous wins, but was unprepared for cabinet participation.

Only three of the 27 cabinet members had previous experience in government, leading to speculation that it wouldn't last long. As it turned out, personality conflicts and the general inexperience of LPF cabinet members led to the rapid implosion of the cabinet after a little more than two months.

=== Resignation of State Secretary Bijlhout ===
The first scandal in the new government came only nine hours after it took office. Philomena Bijlhout, the State Secretary for Social Affairs and Employment and a member of the LPF, resigned after RTL 4 reported that she had been a member of a militia of Surinamese military dictator Dési Bouterse in 1982 and 1983. This was during the period when the militia had committed the political murders known as the "December Murders". Bijlhout, who was born in Suriname, had never denied being part of the militia, but claimed she'd left prior to the December Murders.

=== Power struggles within the LPF and resignation of the cabinet ===
In the months following the election, the LPF was beset by power struggles between various factions. A big incident was when Immigration and Integration Minister Hilbrand Nawijn declared to be in favour of the death penalty. The cabinet was officially opposed to the death penalty. Nawijn responded that he made his remark as leader of the LPF. The party in its turn declared that it was opposed to the death penalty. Nawijn was highly criticised when he declared that it was a personal remark, because it was normal that a minister in a coalition cabinet could make remarks as a party member outside his ministerial responsibility.

In September and October Herman Heinsbroek speculated in public about leading a new party and resigning from the government. This led to tension between him and his supporter Steven van Eyck and Bomhoff. VVD-leader Zalm tried to convince the LPF ministers to replace both Bomhoff and Heinsbroek but his real aim was to use these resignations to call for new elections and to repair the huge losses of his VVD party in the election after the murder of Fortuyn. Disregarding Bomhoff's warnings, the other LPF ministers took the bait and told Bomhoff and Heinsbroek to resign, which they did on 16 October. Immediately, Zalm broke his commitment to the remaining LPF ministers to accept replacements for Bomhoff and Heinsbroek and called for fresh elections. Meetings with the Queen did not take place until the week after the resignation, since she had travelled to Italy immediately after the funeral. On 21 October she accepted the resignation and new elections were called for 22 January 2003. The cabinet remained in place as a demissionary cabinet, without Bomhoff and Heinsbroek, until the elections and formation of the second Balkenende cabinet.

On 12 December 2002 Benk Korthals resigned as caretaker Minister of Defence after a commission of inquiry into building industry fraud accused him of giving false information to the Lower House during the previous cabinet. After resigning he said he still denied the allegations.

After the ensuing new elections, the LPF lost two-thirds of its seats in the House of Representatives. The party was never a significant force in Dutch politics again, and dissolved in 2008.

The term of 87 days (counting the first and last days in full and excluding its "caretaker" function that continued for months afterwards) was the shortest since the fifth cabinet of Hendrikus Colijn (25 July 1939 – 10 August 1939).

=== Actions ===
- Revoking a planned ban on mink farming initiated by the previous cabinet.
- Approval of an expansion of the European Union.
- Support for the United States in its plan to invade Iraq.
- Cuts to Ad Melkert's subsidised jobs scheme, the Melkertbanen.
- Removal of price controls on certain popular medical interventions (knee and hip operations, cataract operations) in an effort to reduce waiting lists.
- Reorganisation of defence, including budget cuts and the termination of 4800 jobs.
- Reduction of spending on public transport by 39 million euros.
- Cuts to the budgets of most government departments, countered by increased spending in health and some other areas.

== Cabinet members ==
Ministers		Title/Ministry/Portfolio(s)			Term of office	Party
Jan Peter Balkenende	Dr. Jan Peter; Balkenende (born 1956)	Prime Minister	General Affairs		22 July 2002 – 14 October 2010^{[Continued]}	Christian; Democratic Appeal
Johan Remkes	Johan Remkes (born 1951)	Deputy; Prime Minister	Interior and Kingdom Relations		22 July 2002 – 27 May 2003	People's Party for Freedom and Democracy
Johan Remkes	Johan Remkes (born 1951)	Minister	Interior and Kingdom Relations		22 July 2002 – 22 February 2007^{[Continued]}	People's Party for Freedom and Democracy
Eduard Bomhoff	Dr. Eduard Bomhoff (born 1944)	Minister	Health, Welfare and Sport		22 July 2002 – 16 October 2002^{[Res]}	Pim Fortuyn List
Eduard Bomhoff	Dr. Eduard Bomhoff (born 1944)	Deputy; Prime Minister	Health, Welfare and Sport		22 July 2002 – 16 October 2002^{[Res]}	Pim Fortuyn List
Roelf de Boer	Roelf de Boer (born 1949)	Deputy; Prime Minister	Transport and Water Management		18 October 2002 – 27 May 2003	Pim Fortuyn List
Roelf de Boer	Roelf de Boer (born 1949)	Minister	Transport and Water Management		22 July 2002 – 27 May 2003	Pim Fortuyn List
Jaap de Hoop Scheffer	Jaap de Hoop; Scheffer (born 1948)	Minister	Foreign Affairs		22 July 2002 – 3 December 2003^{[Continued]}	Christian; Democratic Appeal
Hans Hoogervorsts	Hans Hoogervorst (born 1956)	Minister	Finance		22 July 2002 – 27 May 2003	People's Party for Freedom and Democracy
Hans Hoogervorsts	Hans Hoogervorst (born 1956)	Minister	Economic Affairs		16 October 2002 – 27 May 2003^{[Acting]}	People's Party for Freedom and Democracy
Piet Hein Donner	Piet Hein Donner (born 1948)	Minister	Justice		22 July 2002 – 21 September 2006^{[Continued]}	Christian; Democratic Appeal
Herman Heinsbroek	Herman; Heinsbroek (born 1951)	Minister	Economic Affairs		22 July 2002 – 16 October 2002^{[Res]}	Pim Fortuyn List
Benk Korthals	Benk Korthals (born 1944)	Minister	Defence		22 July 2002 – 12 December 2002^{[Res]}	People's Party for Freedom and Democracy
Henk Kamp	Henk Kamp (born 1952)	Minister	Defence		12 December 2002 – 22 February 2007^{[Continued]}	People's Party for Freedom and Democracy
Henk Kamp	Henk Kamp (born 1952)	Minister	Housing, Spatial; Planning and the Environment		22 July 2002 – 27 May 2003	People's Party for Freedom and Democracy
Aart Jan de Geus	Aart Jan de Geus (born 1955)	Minister	Health, Welfare and Sport		16 October 2002 – 27 May 2003^{[Acting]}	Christian; Democratic Appeal
Aart Jan de Geus	Aart Jan de Geus (born 1955)	Minister	Social Affairs and Employment		22 July 2002 – 22 February 2007^{[Continued]}	Christian; Democratic Appeal
Maria van der Hoeven	Maria van der Hoeven (born 1949)	Minister	Education, Culture and Science		22 July 2002 – 22 February 2007^{[Continued]}	Christian; Democratic Appeal
Cees Veerman	Dr. Cees Veerman (born 1949)	Minister	Agriculture, Nature and Fisheries		22 July 2002 – 1 July 2003^{[Continued]}	Christian; Democratic Appeal
Minister without portfolio		Title/Ministry/Portfolio(s)			Term of office	Party
Hilbrand Nawijn	Hilbrand Nawijn (born 1948)	Minister	Justice	• Immigration and Asylum • Integration • Minorities	22 July 2002 – 27 May 2003	Pim Fortuyn List
State Secretaries		Title/Ministry/Portfolio(s)			Term of office	Party
	Rob Hessing (born 1942)	State Secretary	Interior and Kingdom Relations	• Public Security • Emergency; Services • Emergency; Management	22 July 2002 – 27 May 2003	Pim Fortuyn List
Agnes van Ardenne	Agnes van Ardenne (born 1950)	State Secretary^{[Title]}	Foreign Affairs	• Development; Cooperation	22 July 2002 – 27 May 2003	Christian; Democratic Appeal
Atzo Nicolaï	Atzo Nicolaï (1960–2020)	State Secretary^{[Title]}	Foreign Affairs	• European Union • Benelux	22 July 2002 – 7 July 2006^{[Continued]}	People's Party for Freedom and Democracy
Steven van Eijck	Steven van Eijck (born 1959)	State Secretary	Finance	• Fiscal Policy • Tax and Customs • Governmental; Budget	22 July 2002 – 27 May 2003	Pim Fortuyn List
Joop Wijn	Joop Wijn (born 1969)	State Secretary	Economic Affairs	• Trade and Export • Consumer; Protection • Telecommunication • Postal Service • Tourism	22 July 2002 – 27 May 2003	Christian; Democratic Appeal
Cees van der Knaap	Cees van der Knaap (born 1951)	State Secretary	Defence	• Human; Resources • Equipment	22 July 2002 – 18 December 2007^{[Continued]}	Christian; Democratic Appeal
	Clémence Ross- van Dorp (born 1957)	State Secretary	Health, Welfare and Sport	• Elderly Care • Youth Care • Disability Policy • Medical Ethics • Sport	22 July 2002 – 22 February 2007^{[Continued]}	Christian; Democratic Appeal
Mark Rutte	Mark Rutte (born 1967)	State Secretary	Social Affairs and Employment	• Social Security • Unemployment • Occupational; Safety • Social Services	22 July 2002 – 17 June 2004^{[Continued]}	People's Party for Freedom and Democracy
Philomena Bijlhout	Philomena Bijlhout (born 1957)	State Secretary	Social Affairs and Employment	• Family policy • Equality • Emancipation	22 July 2002 – 24 July 2002^{[Res]}	Pim Fortuyn List
	Khee Liang Phoa (born 1955)	State Secretary	Social Affairs and Employment	• Family policy • Equality • Emancipation	9 September 2002 – 27 May 2003	Pim Fortuyn List
Annette Nijs	Annette Nijs (born 1961)	State Secretary	Education, Culture and Science	• Higher; Education • Adult; Education • Science Policy	22 July 2002 – 9 June 2004^{[Continued]}	People's Party for Freedom and Democracy
	Cees van Leeuwen (born 1951)	State Secretary	Education, Culture and Science	• Media • Culture • Art	22 July 2002 – 27 May 2003	Pim Fortuyn List
Melanie Schultz van Haegen	Melanie Schultz van Haegen (born 1970)	State Secretary	Transport and Water Management	• Public; Infrastructure • Public; Transport • Aviation • Rail Transport • Water; Management • Weather; Forecasting	22 July 2002 – 22 February 2007^{[Continued]}	People's Party for Freedom and Democracy
	Jan Odink (1944–2018)	State Secretary	Agriculture, Nature and Fisheries	• Fisheries • Forestry • Animal Welfare	22 July 2002 – 27 May 2003	Pim Fortuyn List
Pieter van Geel	Pieter van Geel (born 1951)	State Secretary	Housing, Spatial; Planning and the Environment	• Environmental; Policy	22 July 2002 – 22 February 2007^{[Continued]}	Christian; Democratic Appeal

^{Resigned}
^{Continued in the next cabinet}
^{Acting}
^{Designated with the diplomatic rank of Minister}

== See also ==
- First Schüssel government
- Schoof cabinet
