= Khee Liang Phoa =

Dutch politician (born 1955)

Member of the House of Representatives
- In office September 2002 – 27 May 2003

State Secretary for Social Affairs and Employment
- In office 2002–2003
- Prime Minister: Jan Peter Balkenende
- Preceded by: Philomena Bijlhout
- Succeeded by: Henk van Hoof

Personal details
- Born: Khee Liang Phoa; 1955 (age 70–71) Rotterdam
- Party: Pim Fortuyn List
- Occupation: Politician

Chinese name
- Chinese: 潘科良
- Hokkien POJ: Phoaⁿ Khe Liâng
Transcriptions
Standard Mandarin
- Hanyu Pinyin: Pān Kē Liáng
- Bopomofo: ㄆㄢ ㄎㄜ ㄌㄧㄤˊ
- Gwoyeu Romatzyh: Pan Ke Liang
Southern Min
- Hokkien POJ: Phoaⁿ Khe Liâng

Khee Liang Phoa (Chinese: 潘科良; born May 1955, Rotterdam) is a Dutch former politician, who served as undersecretary for emancipation and family affairs in the first Balkenende cabinet from September 2002 to May 2003.

== Biography ==
=== Political work ===
Phoa was born in Rotterdam to Chinese Indonesian parents who had moved to the Netherlands from the Dutch East Indies. He worked in sports physiotherapy and ran his own practice prior to working for Foundation for the Responsible Use of Alcohol as a managing director. He was first introduced to the Pim Fortuyn List (LPF) party through his daughter who had a relationship with fellow LPF member João Varela. He was elected to the Dutch Member of the House of Representatives during the 2002 general election as a member of the Pim Fortuyn List (LPF), making him the first Dutch MP of Chinese descent to be elected to the House.

He became a minister in the first Balkenende cabinet for emancipation and family affairs by succeeding Philomena Bijlhout who had to resign a few hours after her designation following revelations about her past as a militia member in Suriname. Initially, philanthropist and LPF spokeswoman Fiona de Vilder was nominated by party vice-president Ferry Hoogendijk to replace Bijlhout, however de Vilder later declined the position and Phoa was instead put forward.

The fall of the Balkenende I cabinet resulted in the LPF leaving government and losing most of its representation in parliament. As a result, Phoa was not included in the second Balkenende cabinet formed in May 2003 and received a public allowance for two-and-a-half years that related to less than nine months' time as a government minister. He used this money to explore his Chinese roots and study Chinese at the Beijing University of Posts and Telecommunications from 2004 to 2005. He has lived and worked in Beijing since then, after obtaining a position with the freight company Vincent International. From 2006 to 2017 Phoa was also a lecturer in business and English at the Capital University of Economics and Business in China.

== See also ==
- European politicians of Chinese descent
