= Second Kok cabinet =

Cabinet of the Netherlands, 1998 to 2002

Second Kok cabinet Second Purple cabinet
- Cabinet of the Netherlands

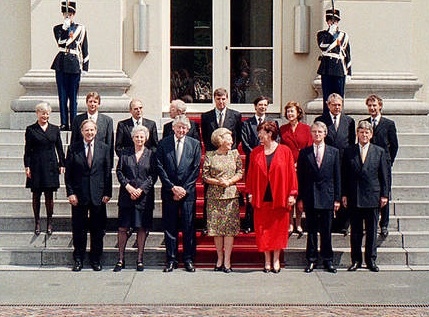
- The installation of the second Kok cabinet on 3 August 1998
- Date formed: 3 August 1998
- Date dissolved: 22 July 2002 (Demissionary from 16 April 2002)

People and organisations
- Head of state: Queen Beatrix
- Head of government: Wim Kok
- Deputy head of government: Annemarie Jorritsma; Els Borst
- No. of ministers: 15
- Ministers removed: 2
- Total no. of members: 17
- Member party: Labour Party (PvdA); People's Party for Freedom and Democracy (VVD); Democrats 66 (D66)
- Status in legislature: Centrist majority grand coalition

History
- Election: 1998 election
- Outgoing election: 2002 election
- Legislature terms: 1998–2002
- Incoming formation: 1998 formation
- Outgoing formation: 2002 formation
- Predecessor: First Kok cabinet
- Successor: First Balkenende cabinet

The second Kok cabinet, also called the second Purple cabinet, was the executive branch of the Dutch government from 3 August 1998 until 22 July 2002.

The cabinet was a continuation of the previous first Kok cabinet and was formed by the social-democratic Labour Party (PvdA), the conservative-liberal People's Party for Freedom and Democracy (VVD) and the social-liberal Democrats 66 after the election of 1998. The cabinet was a centrist grand coalition and had a substantial majority in the House of Representatives with Labour Leader Wim Kok serving as Prime Minister. Prominent Liberal politician Annemarie Jorritsma, the Minister of Transport and Water Management in the previous cabinet, served as Deputy Prime Minister and Minister of Economic Affairs, while former progressive-liberal leader Els Borst continued as Minister of Health, Welfare and Sport and also served as Deputy Prime Minister.

The cabinet served during the economic expansion of the late 1990s and early unstable 2000s. Domestically, it was able to implement several major social reforms such as legalising same-sex marriage, and had to deal with the assassination of Pim Fortuyn. Internationally, it had to deal with several crises such as the fallout of the Srebrenica massacre and the response to September 11 attacks. The cabinet suffered several major internal and external conflicts including multiple cabinet resignations; the cabinet itself resigned prematurely on two occasions: first following a major political crisis in May 1999 (it later came back on its resignation), and second, following the conclusions of a report into the Srebrenica massacre on 16 April 2002. It continued in a demissionary capacity until it was replaced following the election of 2002.

== Formation ==
Composition of the cabinet in relation to the rest of the legislature

The new cabinet was the successor of the First Kok cabinet (First Purple cabinet) and was formed from the same coalition of Labour Party, People's Party for Freedom and Democracy and Democrats 66. It was also known as the 'tweede paarse kabinet' ('second purple cabinet') called such because it contained both the social-democratic Labour Party (red) and the liberal People's Party for Freedom and Democracy (blue).

== Term ==
The aim of the cabinet was to continue the policy of cabinet Kok I, which was concerned with economizing, tax reduction and making an end to unemployment. Wim Kok was the Prime Minister, Annemarie Jorritsma as the Deputy Prime Minister for the People's Party for Freedom and Democracy, and Els Borst for Democrats 66. There was no strong opposition in the parliament. The cabinet completed processes of liberalisation which were started by the previous cabinet: the legalisation of prostitution in 2000, same-sex marriage in 2001 and Euthanasia in 2002. This cabinet was notable for resigning twice. The first time was in May 1999, when Democrats 66 stepped out of the coalition when proposed legislation entered by this party was blocked; through negotiations the crisis was solved and the cabinet stayed together. The second and final time was on 16 April 2002, just one month before the next election, when Prime Minister Kok wished to resign over the NIOD report into the genocide of Srebrenica in 1995 and the other ministers had no choice but to follow him. The Second Kok cabinet remained in place as a Demissionary cabinet until 22 July 2002, when it was replaced by the First Balkenende cabinet.

=== Changes ===
On 7 June 1999 Minister of Agriculture, Nature and Fisheries Haijo Apotheker (D66) resigned citing that as a former mayor he could not adjust to national politics. Minister of Social Affairs and Employment Klaas de Vries (PvdA) served as acting Minister of Agriculture, Nature and Fisheries until 9 June 1999 when Member of the European Parliament Laurens Jan Brinkhorst (D66), a former State Secretary for Foreign Affairs was appointed as his successor.

On 13 March 2000 Minister of the Interior and Kingdom Relations Bram Peper (PvdA) resigned after a report was released about inappropriate declarations he had made when he served as Mayor of Rotterdam. Minister for Integration and Urban Planning Roger van Boxtel (D66) served as acting Minister of the Interior and Kingdom Relations until 24 March 2000 when Minister of Social Affairs and Employment Klaas de Vries (PvdA) was installed as his successor. That same day State Secretary for Finance Willem Vermeend (PvdA) was appointed as Minister of Social Affairs and Employment and Member of the House of Representatives Wouter Bos (PvdA) was installed as State Secretary for Finance.

On 1 January 2001 State Secretary for Justice Job Cohen (PvdA) resigned after he was appointed as Mayor of Amsterdam. That same day Member of the House of Representatives Ella Kalsbeek (PvdA) was installed as his successor.

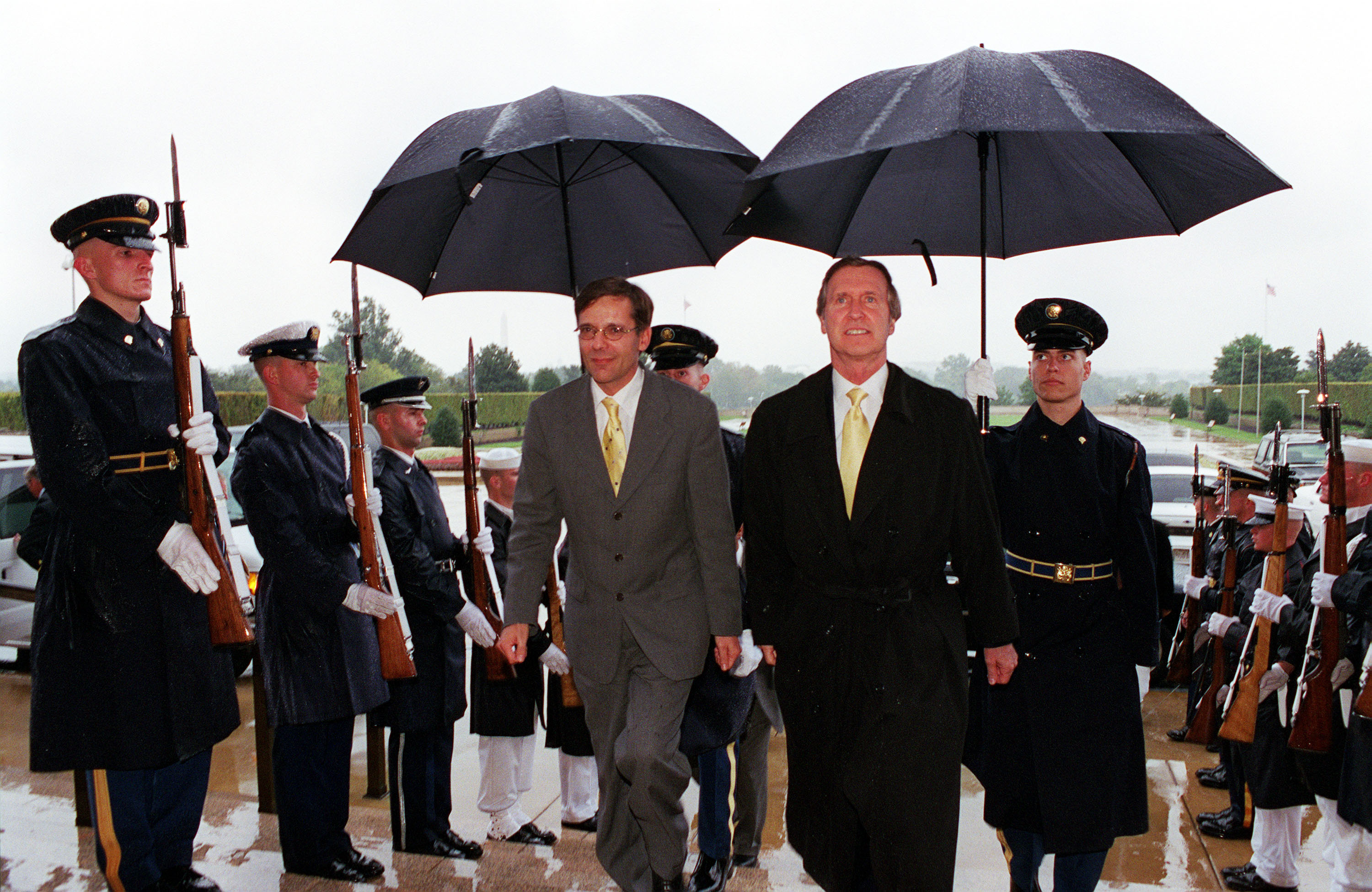
Minister Frank de Grave and United States Secretary of Defense William Cohen at The Pentagon on 25 September 2000.

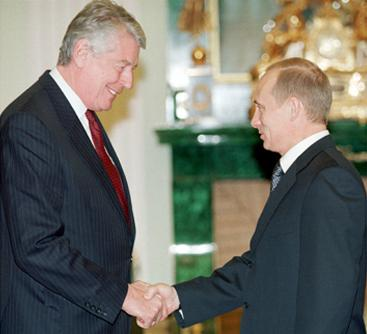
Prime Minister Wim Kok and President of Russia Vladimir Putin at the Grand Kremlin Palace in Moscow on 19 January 2001.

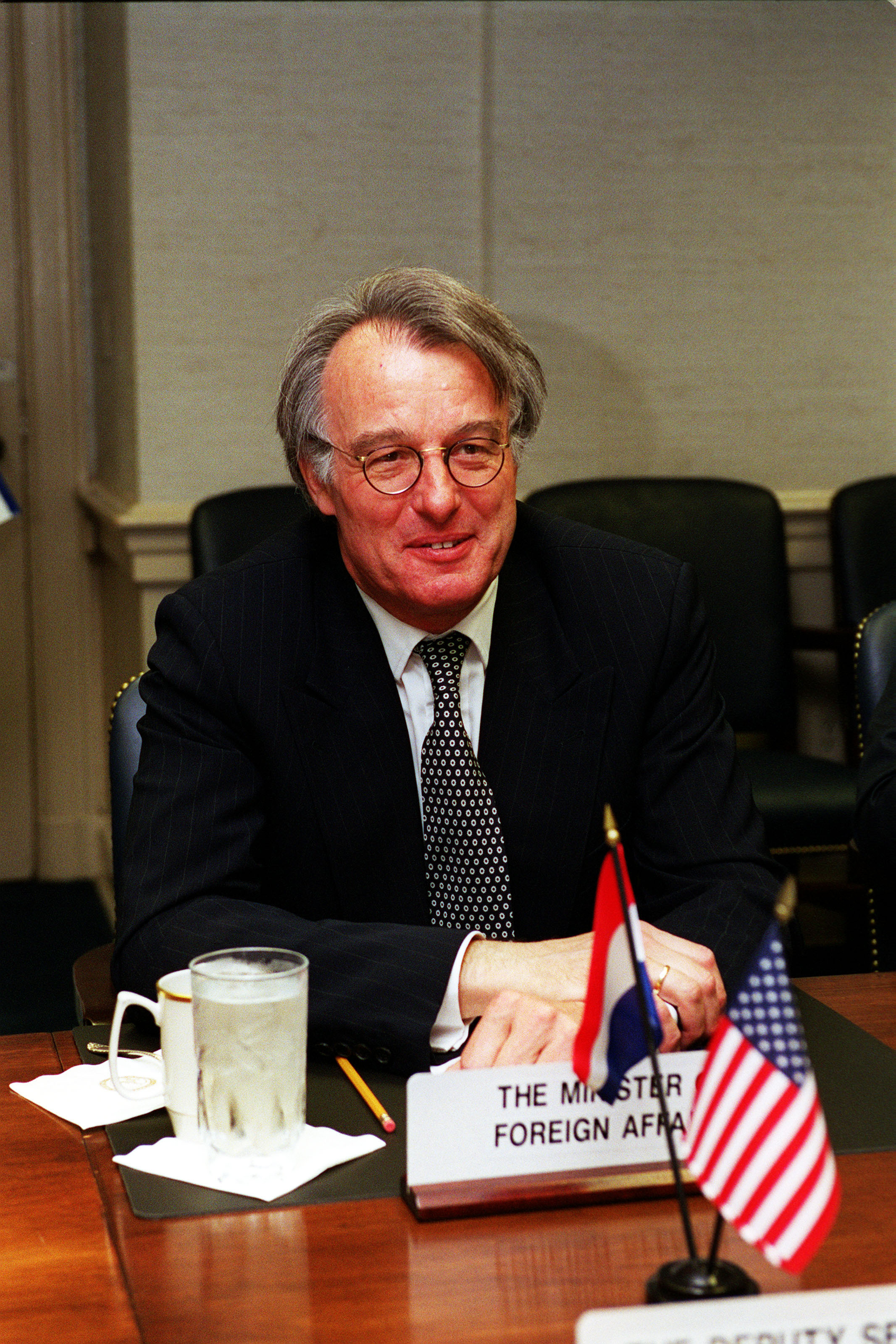
Minister Jozias van Aartsen at The Pentagon on 18 May 2001.

== Cabinet members ==
Ministers		Title/Ministry/Portfolio(s)			Term of office	Party
Wim Kok	Wim Kok (1938–2018)	Prime Minister	General Affairs		22 August 1994 – 22 July 2002^{[Retained]}	Labour Party
Annemarie Jorritsma	Annemarie; Jorritsma (born 1950)	Deputy Prime; Minister	Economic Affairs		3 August 1998 – 22 July 2002	People's Party for Freedom and Democracy
Annemarie Jorritsma	Annemarie; Jorritsma (born 1950)	Minister	Economic Affairs		3 August 1998 – 22 July 2002	People's Party for Freedom and Democracy
Els Borst	Els Borst (1932–2014)	Deputy Prime; Minister	Health, Welfare and Sport		3 August 1998 – 22 July 2002	Democrats 66
Els Borst	Els Borst (1932–2014)	Minister	Health, Welfare and Sport		22 August 1994 – 22 July 2002^{[Retained]}	Democrats 66
Bram Peper	Bram Peper (1940–2022)	Minister	Interior and Kingdom Relations		3 August 1998 – 13 March 2000^{[Res]}	Labour Party
Roger van Boxtel	Roger van Boxtel (born 1954)	Minister	Interior and Kingdom Relations		13 March 2000 – 24 March 2000^{[Ad Interim]}	Democrats 66
Klaas de Vries	Klaas de Vries (born 1943)	Minister	Interior and Kingdom Relations		24 March 2000 – 22 July 2002	Labour Party
Jozias van Aartsen	Jozias van Aartsen (born 1947)	Minister	Foreign Affairs		3 August 1998 – 22 July 2002	People's Party for Freedom and Democracy
Gerrit Zalm	Gerrit Zalm (born 1952)	Minister	Finance		22 August 1994 – 22 July 2002^{[Retained]}	People's Party for Freedom and Democracy
Benk Korthals	Benk Korthals (born 1944)	Minister	Justice		3 August 1998 – 22 July 2002	People's Party for Freedom and Democracy
Frank de Grave	Frank de Grave (born 1955)	Minister	Defence		3 August 1998 – 22 July 2002	People's Party for Freedom and Democracy
Klaas de Vries	Klaas de Vries (born 1943)	Minister	Social Affairs and Employment		3 August 1998 – 24 March 2000^{[App]}	Labour Party
Willem Vermeend	Willem; Vermeend (born 1948)	Minister	Social Affairs and Employment		24 March 2000 – 22 July 2002	Labour Party
Loek Hermans	Loek Hermans (born 1951)	Minister	Education, Culture and Science		3 August 1998 – 22 July 2002	People's Party for Freedom and Democracy
Tineke Netelenbos	Tineke; Netelenbos (born 1944)	Minister	Transport and Water Management		3 August 1998 – 22 July 2002	Labour Party
	Hayo Apotheker (born 1950)	Minister	Agriculture, Nature and Fisheries		3 August 1998 – 7 June 1999^{[Res]}	Democrats 66
Klaas de Vries	Klaas de Vries (born 1943)	Minister	Agriculture, Nature and Fisheries		7 June 1999 – 9 June 1999^{[Ad Interim]}	Labour Party
Laurens Jan Brinkhorst	Laurens Jan; Brinkhorst (born 1937)	Minister	Agriculture, Nature and Fisheries		9 June 1999 – 22 July 2002	Democrats 66
Jan Pronk	Jan Pronk (born 1940)	Minister	Housing, Spatial; Planning and the Environment		3 August 1998 – 22 July 2002	Labour Party
Ministers without portfolio		Title/Ministry/Portfolio(s)			Term of office	Party
Roger van Boxtel	Roger van Boxtel (born 1954)	Minister	Interior and Kingdom Relations	• Urban Planning • Integration • Minorities	3 August 1998 – 22 July 2002	Democrats 66
Eveline Herfkens	Eveline; Herfkens (born 1952)	Minister	Foreign Affairs	• Development; Cooperation	3 August 1998 – 22 July 2002	Labour Party
State Secretaries		Title/Ministry/Portfolio(s)			Term of office	Party
Gijs de Vries	Gijs de Vries (born 1956)	State Secretary	Interior and Kingdom Relations	• Kingdom; Relations • Emergency; Services • Emergency; Management • Regional; Languages	3 August 1998 – 22 July 2002	People's Party for Freedom and Democracy
Dick Benschop	Dick Benschop (born 1957)	State Secretary	Foreign Affairs	• European Union • Benelux	3 August 1998 – 22 July 2002	Labour Party
Willem Vermeend	Willem; Vermeend (born 1948)	State Secretary	Finance	• Fiscal Policy • Tax and Customs • Governmental; Budget	22 August 1994 – 24 March 2000^{[Retained]} ^{[App]}	Labour Party
Wouter Bos	Wouter Bos (born 1963)	State Secretary	Finance	• Fiscal Policy • Tax and Customs • Governmental; Budget	24 March 2000 – 22 July 2002	Labour Party
Job Cohen	Job Cohen (born 1947)	State Secretary	Justice	• Immigration and Asylum • Civil Law • Judicial Reform • Youth Justice • Penitentiaries • Debt • Gambling	3 August 1998 – 1 January 2001^{[App]}	Labour Party
Ella Kalsbeek	Ella Kalsbeek (born 1955)	State Secretary	Justice	• Immigration and Asylum • Civil Law • Judicial Reform • Youth Justice • Penitentiaries • Debt • Gambling	1 January 2001 – 22 July 2002	Labour Party
Gerrit Ybema	Gerrit Ybema (1945–2012)	State Secretary^{[Title]}	Economic Affairs	• Trade and Export • Small and Medium-sized; Businesses • Regional; Development • Consumer; Protection • Tourism	3 August 1998 – 22 July 2002	Democrats 66
Henk van Hoof	Henk van Hoof (born 1947)	State Secretary	Defence	• Human; Resources • Equipment	3 August 1998 – 22 July 2002	People's Party for Freedom and Democracy
Margo Vliegenthart	Margo; Vliegenthart (born 1958)	State Secretary	Health, Welfare and Sport	• Elderly Care • Youth Care • Disability Policy • Pharmaceutical; Policy • Sport	3 August 1998 – 22 July 2002	Labour Party
Hans Hoogervorsts	Hans; Hoogervorst (born 1956)	State Secretary	Social Affairs and Employment	• Social Security • Occupational; Safety • Social Services	3 August 1998 – 22 July 2002	People's Party for Freedom and Democracy
	Annelies; Verstand (born 1949)	State Secretary	Social Affairs and Employment	• Unemployment • Equality • Emancipation	3 August 1998 – 22 July 2002	Democrats 66
Karin Adelmund	Karin; Adelmund (1949–2005)	State Secretary	Education, Culture and Science	• Primary; Education • Secondary; Education • Special; Education	3 August 1998 – 22 July 2002	Labour Party
Rick van der Ploeg	Rick van der Ploeg (born 1956)	State Secretary	Education, Culture and Science	• Media • Culture • Art	3 August 1998 – 22 July 2002	Labour Party
Monique de Vries	Monique de Vries (born 1947)	State Secretary	Transport and Water Management	• Telecommunication • Water; Management • Postal Service • Weather; Forecasting	3 August 1998 – 22 July 2002	People's Party for Freedom and Democracy
Geke Faber	Geke Faber (born 1952)	State Secretary	Agriculture, Nature and Fisheries	• Food Policy • Nature • Fisheries • Forestry • Animal Welfare	3 August 1998 – 22 July 2002	Labour Party
Johan Remkes	Johan Remkes (born 1951)	State Secretary	Housing, Spatial; Planning and the Environment	• Public Housing • Spatial Planning • Environmental; Policy	3 August 1998 – 22 July 2002	People's Party for Freedom and Democracy

^{Resigned}
^{Retained from the previous cabinet}
^{Ad Interim}
^{Designated with the diplomatic rank of Minister}
^{Medical leave of absence from 4 June 1996 until 26 June 1996}
^{Appointed as Minister of the Interior and Kingdom Relations}
^{Appointed as Minister of Social Affairs and Employment}
^{Appointed as Mayor of Amsterdam}

== Trivia ==
- Seven cabinet members had previous experience as scholars and professors: Els Borst (Medical Ethics), Bram Peper (Social Economics), Gerrit Zalm (Political Economics), Willem Vermeend (Fiscal Law), Laurens Jan Brinkhorst (International Law and Relations), Job Cohen (Jurisprudence) and Rick van der Ploeg (Macroeconomics).
- Seven cabinet members (later) served as Party Leaders: Wim Kok (1986–2001), Wouter Bos (2002–2010), Job Cohen (2010–2012) of the Labour Party, Gerrit Zalm (2002–2004) and Jozias van Aartsen (2004–2006) of the People's Party for Freedom and Democracy, Els Borst (1998) and Laurens Jan Brinkhorst (1982) of the Democrats 66.
- Eleven cabinet members (later) served as Mayor: Annemarie Jorritsma (Delfzijl and Almere), Bram Peper (Rotterdam), Jozias van Aartsen (The Hague and Amsterdam), Loek Hermans (Zwolle), Tineke Netelenbos (Ede, Haarlemmermeer and Oud-Beijerland), Haijo Apotheker (Muntendam, Veendam, Leeuwarden, Steenwijk, Steenwijkerland, Sneek, Súdwest-Fryslân, Waadhoeke and Noardeast-Fryslân), Job Cohen (Amsterdam), Henk van Hoof (Delfzijl), Annelies Verstand (Heteren and Zutphen), Geke Faber (Zeewolde, Wageningen, Den Helder and Zaanstad) and Johan Remkes (The Hague).
