= Roelf de Boer =

Dutch politician (born 1949)

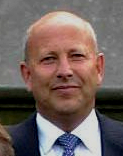
- De Boer in 2002

Deputy Prime Minister
- In office 22 July 2002 – 27 May 2003 Serving with Johan Remkes
- Prime Minister: Jan Peter Balkenende
- Preceded by: Eduard Bomhoff
- Succeeded by: Gerrit Zalm

Transport and Water Management
- In office 22 July 2002 – 27 May 2003
- Prime Minister: Jan Peter Balkenende
- Preceded by: Tineke Netelenbos
- Succeeded by: Karla Peijs

Personal details
- Born: 9 September 1949 (age 76) Rotterdam, Netherlands
- Party: Pim Fortuyn List (2002–2003)
- Other political affiliations: VVD
- Occupation: Public administrator, politician, businessman

Roelf Hendrik de Boer (born 9 October 1949) is a retired Dutch politician and businessman who was a member the Pim Fortuyn List (LPF) and briefly served as Deputy Prime Minister from 2002 to 2003.

== Biography ==
De Boer served as a reservist in the Dutch navy before becoming a businessman. He worked for the Nedlloyd shipping company and then as the president of the European Waterways Transport (EWT). He was a member of the VVD before joining the LPF. de Boer served as part of the first Balkenende cabinet as minister for Transport and Water Management and later as Deputy Prime Minister following the resignation of Eduard Bomhoff. During his time in politics, he campaigned for the prices of rail tickets to be lowered and for smaller fines for mild speeding offenses.

Following the collapse of the first Balkenende cabinet, he returned to working as a public administrator for Royal Dutch Transport (KNV) and as chairman for the Value8 business investment group. He attempted a return to politics in 2006 by standing for the municipal elections in Rotterdam, but resigned due to health problems.
