= David Tweedie (accountant) =

Scottish accountant (born 1944)

Sir David Philip Tweedie CVO FRSE (born 7 July 1944) is a British accountant. He is the former chairman of the International Accounting Standards Board (2001–2011) and the ninetieth member of The Accounting Hall of Fame.

== Career ==
Born in Newcastle-Upon-Tyne, Tweedie graduated with a BCom followed by a PhD in 1969 from the University of Edinburgh Management School, and is currently a visiting professor.

He then trained as a Chartered Accountant with Mann Judd Gordon & Co, qualifying in 1972. He lectured at his alma mater from 1973 to 1978, then became the technical director of the Institute of Chartered Accountants of Scotland (ICAS) until 1981.

In 1982 he moved to a large firm of accountants, KMG Thomson McLintock, where he was national research partner. When KMG merged with Peat Marwick International to form accounting giant KPMG in 1987, he became its national technical partner.

From 1990 to 2000 Tweedie served as the full-time chairman of the Accounting Standards Board. Then in 2001 he was appointed as the initial Chairman of the International Accounting Standards Board. He retained the role for a decade, through the 2008 financial crisis, and stood down in June 2011, succeeded by Hans Hoogervorst.

He has been nominated as President of ICAS, an honorary position, for 2012.

In September 2012 he was appointed as chairman of the Board of Trustees of the International Valuation Standards Council

Tweedie was appointed Commander of the Royal Victorian Order (CVO) in the 2020 Birthday Honours for services to the Royal Household, as chairman of the audit, risk and compliance committee.

== Awards ==
- Knighted 1994
- Honorary degrees from at least seven UK universities
  - Including Honorary Doctorate from Heriot-Watt University in 1996
- ICAEW's Founding Societies Centenary Award, 1997
- CIMA Award 1998
- Accountancy Age Personality of the Year 2004 and Award for Outstanding Contribution to the Profession
- ICAS Vice-president 2011
- The ninetieth member of The Accounting Hall of Fame, 2013

== Private life ==
David Tweedie lives in North Berwick with his wife. They have two sons.

== See also ==
- International Valuation Standards
- International Financial Reporting Standards
