= Philomena Bijlhout =

Dutch politician

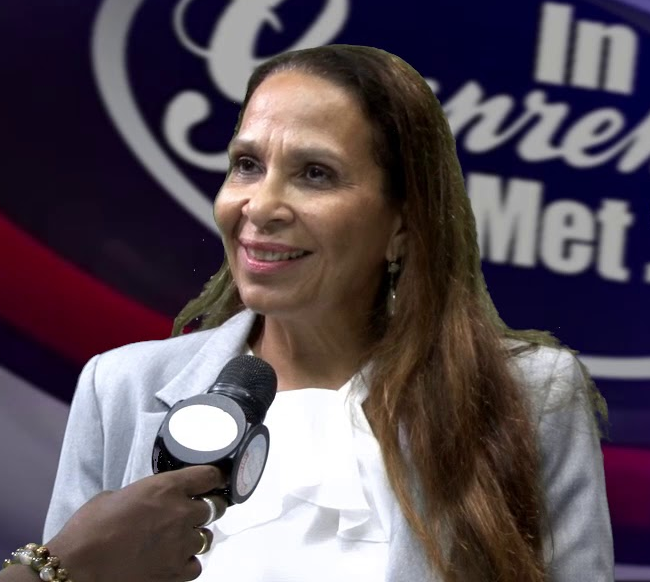
- Bijlhout in 2020

Member of the House of Representatives
- In office 23 May 2002 – 22 July 2002

State Secretary for Social Affairs and Employment
- In office 22 July 2002 – 22 July 2002
- Prime Minister: Jan Peter Balkenende
- Preceded by: Hans Hoogervorst; Annelies Verstand
- Succeeded by: Khee Liang Phoa

Personal details
- Born: Rudolphina Rebecca Philomena Bijlhout; 13 November 1957 (age 68) Paramaribo, Suriname
- Party: Pim Fortuyn List
- Occupation: Politician, television presenter, social worker

Philomena Bijlhout (born 13 November 1957) is a Surinamese-born Dutch former politician and television presenter.

She served as an MP in the Member of the House of Representatives as a member of the Pim Fortuyn List and was briefly State Secretary for Social Affairs, Employment and Equality in the First Balkenende cabinet. Her tenure was notable for being the first female foreign-born and ethnic minority politician to hold the post and the shortest in Dutch political history.

Bijlhout has since worked as a broadcaster.

== Biography ==
Bijlhout worked in television broadcasting in Suriname and later in the Netherlands. She was editor-in-chief and a presenter for RTV Rijnmond.

As a close associate of nationalist politician Pim Fortuyn, in 2002 she was recruited as a candidate for the Pim Fortuyn List (LPF) party. She was elected as a member of the House of Representatives for the Pim Fortuyn List from 23 May 2002 until 22 July 2002, when she became State Secretary for Social Affairs and Work Opportunity in the first Balkenende cabinet. Bijlhout was the first female ethnic minority politician in the Netherlands to hold the position.

However, she resigned a few hours after being appointed, after television channel RTL 4 reported that she had been a member of a militia operated by Surinamese military dictator Dési Bouterse from 1982 and 1983. This was during the period when the militia had committed the political murders known as the "December murders". Bijlhout, who was born in Suriname, had never denied being part of the militia, but claimed she had left prior to the December murders. She claimed in an interview in de Volkskrant that there were no photographs of her in uniform in the militia and that she had left by 1981, but RTL 4 produced a photograph dated 1983 which appeared to show Bijlhout was still an active member. This subsequently triggered her resignation. Her tenure as a state secretary was the shortest in Dutch history. She was succeeded by Khee Liang Phoa. Bijlhout claimed that when she stood down from the position of State Secretary, LPF leader Mat Herben had said she was welcome to remain in the House for the party; however, Bijlhout decided to stand down as an MP too, due to the intense media response to the controversy.

After retiring from Dutch politics, Bijlhout hosted a travel show in 2004 and worked as a reporter for the Surinamese newspaper De Ware Tijd. She later became a social worker in Rotterdam. In 2008, she published an autobiography More than a Day.
