= Ab Klink =

Dutch politician (born 1958)

His Excellency Ab Klink
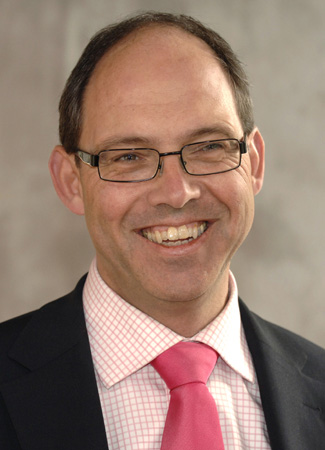
- Klink in 2007

Member of the House of Representatives
- In office 17 June 2010 – 7 September 2010
- Parliamentary group: Christian Democratic Appeal

Minister of Health, Welfare and Sport
- In office 22 February 2007 – 14 October 2010
- Prime Minister: Jan Peter Balkenende
- Preceded by: Hans Hoogervorst
- Succeeded by: Edith Schippers

Member of the Senate
- In office 10 June 2003 – 22 February 2007
- Parliamentary group: Christian Democratic Appeal

Personal details
- Born: Abraham Klink; 2 November 1958 (age 67) Stellendam, Netherlands
- Party: Christian Democratic Appeal (from 1983)
- Education: Erasmus University Rotterdam (Bachelor of Social Science, Master of Social Science; Leiden University (Doctor of Philosophy)
- Occupation: Politician · Civil servant · Jurist · Sociologist · Researcher · Corporate director · Nonprofit director · Author · Professor

Abraham "Ab" Klink (born 2 November 1958) is a retired Dutch politician of Christian Democratic Appeal (CDA) and sociologist. He is a corporate director of the VGZ Cooperative since 1 January 2014 and a professor at the Vrije Universiteit Amsterdam for Healthcare, Labor and Political Guidance since 1 January 2011.

== Decorations ==
Honours
Ribbon bar	Honour	Country	Date	Comment
	Officer of the Order of Orange-Nassau	Netherlands	3 December 2010	Elevated from Knight (30 April 2004)

Party political offices
Unknown	President of the Christian Democratic Appeal; Policy Institute; 1999–2007	Succeeded by Rien Fraanje
Political offices
Preceded by Hans Hoogervorst	Minister of Health, Welfare and Sport; 2007–2010	Succeeded by Edith Schippers
