= Arthur Docters van Leeuwen =

Dutch politician (1945–2020)

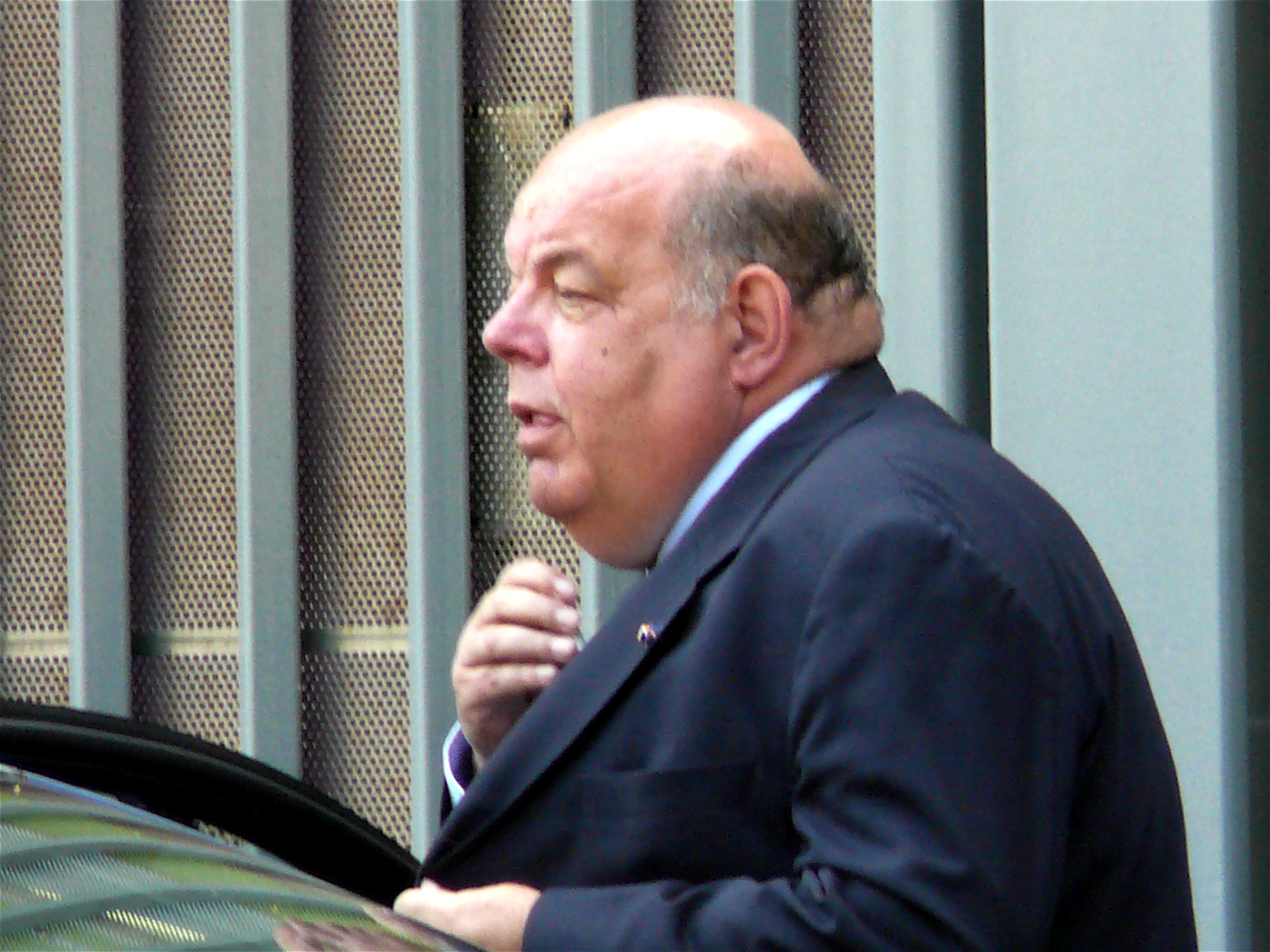
Arthur Docters van Leeuwen

Arthur Docters van Leeuwen (8 May 1945 – 14 August 2020) was a Dutch politician, jurist and civil servant. He was member of the liberal political party VVD. Between 1999 and 2007 he was chairman of the Netherlands Authority for the Financial Markets, an agency of the Dutch government, which supervises Dutch financial markets.

== Career ==
Docters van Leeuwen was born in The Hague on 8 May 1945. After studying law (degree 1969) and various functions for the Dutch government, he became head of the Domestic Security Service, the Dutch secret service (currently the AIVD), in 1989. In 1995, he was succeeded by Nico Buis, after Docters van Leeuwen became a member and chairman of the Board of Procurators General in The Hague (a board which supervises Dutch public prosecutors).

As a member of this board, Docters van Leeuwen came into conflict in 1998 with Justice minister Winnie Sorgdrager (D66). The question was about a conflict of interest of another member of the board, Dato Steenhuis, who was on the pay-roll of the company that looked into the workings of the public prosecution in the region of which Dato Steenhuis, as board member, was responsible. Docters van Leeuwen supported Steenhuis against Sorgdrager; the ensuing breach of confidence between the two resulted in Docters van Leeuwen being fired from the Board. Shortly thereafter, in September 1999, Docters van Leeuwen became chairman of the Netherlands Authority for the Financial Markets.

In June 2007 Docters van Leeuwen stepped down as chairman of the Netherlands Authority for the Financial Markets. After his retirement as a civil servant he became chairman of the Holland Financial Centre, research fellow at the Netherlands School for Public Administration and chairman of the advisory board of IRS, a company active in the field of security, investigations and integrity management.

== Political career ==
Although at first a member of the social liberal D66, Docters van Leeuwen became a member of the VVD, for which he co-authored the new foundational program, the Liberal Manifest. In 2006, he was a candidate for the VVD for the Dutch general election. He removed himself from the list though, after he obtained a lower (#10) position on the list than Fred Teeven (#5). Fred Teeven was a public prosecutor in Amsterdam at that time. Docters van Leeuwen reasoned with his lower position than Teeven's on the candidacy list that "clearly the VVD chooses a direction that is not mine."

== Personal life ==
Docters van Leeuwen suffered a heart attack at age 75.
