= Geke Faber =

Dutch politician (born 1952)

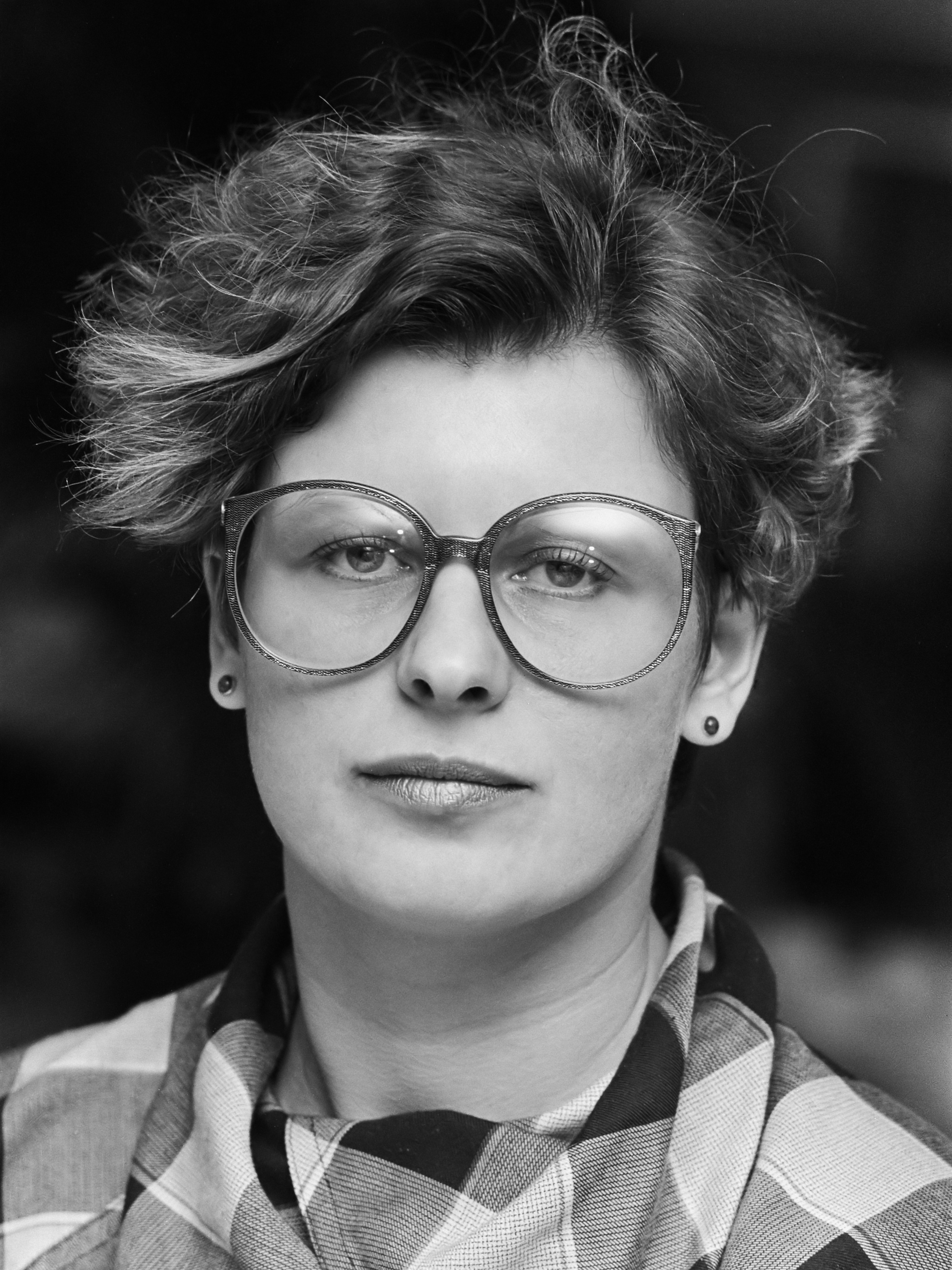
- Faber (1985)
- Born: 5 August 1952 (age 73) 's-Graveland

Geesje Hendrika (Geke) Faber (born 5 August 1952) is a Dutch politician who was mayor of Zaanstad from 2007 until 2016. Between 1990 and 1998 she was mayor of Zeewolde, she served as interim mayor in Wageningen between 2002 and 2003 and in Den Helder between 2005 and 2007. In the Second Kok cabinet she served as State Secretary for Agriculture, Nature Management and Fishery.
