= Gerrit Zalm =

Dutch politician (born 1952)

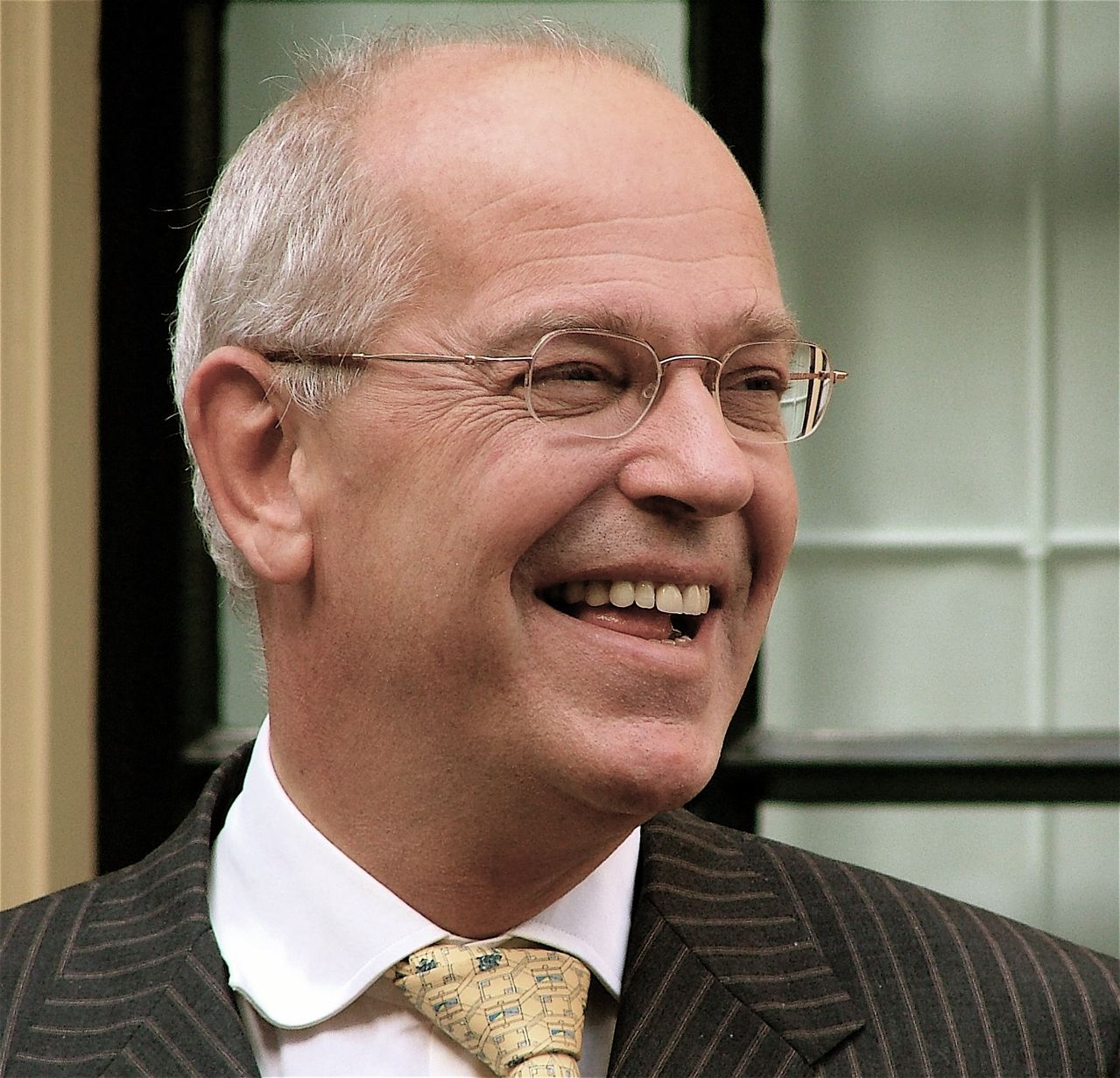
- Zalm in 2006

Minister of Economic Affairs
- In office 3 July 2006 – 7 July 2006; Acting
- Prime Minister: Jan Peter Balkenende
- Preceded by: Laurens Jan Brinkhorst
- Succeeded by: Joop Wijn

Deputy Prime Minister of the Netherlands
- In office 27 May 2003 – 22 February 2007 Serving with Thom de Graaf (2003–2005); Laurens Jan Brinkhorst (2005–2006)
- Prime Minister: Jan Peter Balkenende
- Preceded by: Johan Remkes; Roelf de Boer
- Succeeded by: Wouter Bos; André Rouvoet

Parliamentary leader in the House of Representatives
- In office 23 May 2002 – 27 May 2003
- Preceded by: Hans Dijkstal
- Succeeded by: Jozias van Aartsen
- Parliamentary group: People's Party for Freedom and Democracy

Leader of the People's Party for Freedom and Democracy
- In office 16 May 2002 – 27 November 2004
- Preceded by: Hans Dijkstal
- Succeeded by: Jozias van Aartsen

Member of the House of Representatives
- In office 23 May 2002 – 27 May 2003
- In office 19 May 1998 – 3 August 1998

Minister of Finance
- In office 27 May 2003 – 22 February 2007
- Prime Minister: Jan Peter Balkenende
- Preceded by: Hans Hoogervorst
- Succeeded by: Wouter Bos
- In office 26 June 1996 – 22 July 2002
- Prime Minister: Wim Kok
- Preceded by: Hans Wijers (ad interim)
- Succeeded by: Hans Hoogervorst
- In office 22 August 1994 – 4 June 1996
- Prime Minister: Wim Kok
- Preceded by: Wim Kok
- Succeeded by: Hans Wijers (ad interim)

Director of the Bureau for Economic Policy Analysis
- In office 1 January 1989 – 22 August 1994
- Preceded by: Peter de Ridder
- Succeeded by: Henk Don

Personal details
- Born: Gerrit Zalm; 6 May 1952 (age 74) Enkhuizen, Netherlands
- Party: People's Party for Freedom and Democracy (from 1982)
- Other political affiliations: Labour Party (1971–1981)
- Spouses: First wife (m. 1971; div. 1978) Lydia Brouwer (m. 1982)
- Children: 3 sons and 2 daughters
- Relatives: Pier Gerlofs Donia (relative)
- Education: Vrije Universiteit Amsterdam (BEc, M.Econ)
- Occupation: Politician; civil servant; economist; businessperson; banker; corporate director; nonprofit director; author; professor

Gerrit Zalm (Dutch: [ˈɣɛrɪt ˈsɑl(ə)m]; born 6 May 1952) is a retired Dutch politician of the People's Party for Freedom and Democracy (VVD) and businessman.

Zalm studied Economics at the Vrije Universiteit Amsterdam, obtaining a Master of Economics degree, and worked as a civil servant for the Ministry of Finance, the Ministry of Economic Affairs and the Bureau for Economic Policy Analysis from June 1975 until August 1994, and as a professor of Political economy at his alma mater from January 1990 until August 1994. After the 1994 general election, Zalm was appointed Minister of Finance in the Kok I cabinet, taking office on 22 August 1994. After the 1998 general election, Zalm continued his position in the Kok II cabinet. In the 2002 general election, Zalm was elected to the House of Representatives on 23 May 2002. Shortly after the election, party leader and parliamentary leader Hans Dijkstal announced he was stepping down and Zalm was unanimously selected as his successor as leader on 16 May 2002, and became parliamentary leader on 23 May 2002. For the 2003 general election, Zalm served as lead candidate, and following a successful cabinet formation that formed the Balkenende II cabinet was appointed as Deputy Prime Minister of the Netherlands and Minister of Finance, taking office on 27 May 2003. On 27 November 2004 Zalm announced he was stepping down as party leader in favor of and parliamentary leader Jozias van Aartsen. The Balkenende II cabinet fell on 30 June 2006 and was replaced by the caretaker Balkenende III cabinet, with Zalm continuing his offices. In August 2006, Zalm announced his retirement, stating he would not stand for the 2006 general election.

Zalm retired from active politics at 54 and became active in the private sector as a corporate director, and worked as a banker for the DSB Bank, Fortis Bank and ABN AMRO from July 2007 until February 2017. Following his retirement Zalm became active in the public sector as a non-profit director and served on several state commissions and councils on behalf of the government, and worked as an occasional mediator for coalition agreements. Zalm is known for his abilities as a skilful manager and effective debater and as of 2026 continues to comment on political affairs. He holds the distinction as the longest-serving Minister of Finance, with 11 years and 240 days, in Dutch history.

== Biography ==
=== Early life ===
Gerrit Zalm was born on 6 May 1952 in Enkhuizen, Netherlands. Following his graduation from high school ("HBS-A" level) in Enkhuizen, Zalm began a study in economics at the Vrije Universiteit in Amsterdam, from which he graduated in 1975. In the same year he joined the Ministry of Finance. From 1983 he worked for the Ministry of Economic Affairs, where he eventually became a director. In 1988 he was appointed deputy director of the Centraal Planbureau, a state institution that, among other things, calculates the financial effects of government plans. In 1989 he became director of this institute. In that capacity Zalm had, although not formally a politician, a significant influence on politics. From 1990 he also gave lectures at the Vrije Universiteit.

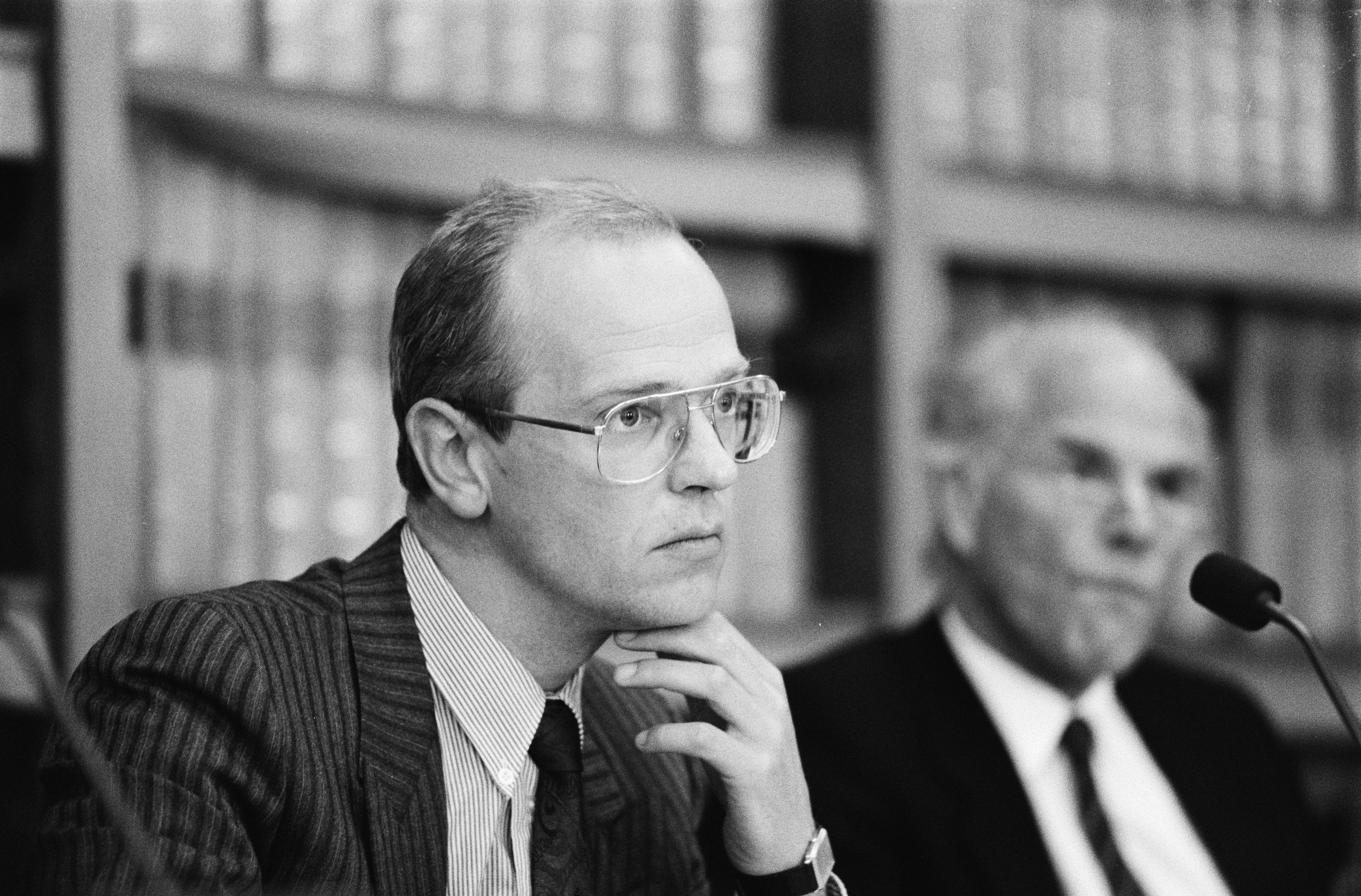
Director of the Bureau for Economic Policy Analysis Gerrit Zalm during a press conference in The Hague on 24 May 1989.

=== Politics ===
Between 22 August 1994 and 22 July 2002, Zalm, member of the People's Party for Freedom and Democracy, was Minister of Finance in the first and second Wim Kok administrations. The Dutch economy being very healthy during those years, he did not experience large difficulties. However, he did introduce certain standards that are in effect until now, among which the Zalmnorm (Zalm standard) which describes a state policy by which the state does not respond extremely to economic fluctuations but just counteracts them. During the first, short Balkenende administration, Zalm was the acting leader of the People's Party for Freedom and Democracy group in parliament. On 27 May 2003 he started his third term as Minister of Finance, in the second Balkenende administration, also serving as Deputy Prime Minister. On 30 June 2006, he succeeded Laurens Jan Brinkhorst as Minister of Economic Affairs, ad interim, with most tasks delegated to Undersecretary Karien van Gennip. On 7 July 2006 Joop Wijn was appointed as the new Minister of Economic Affairs.

=== Banking ===
On 26 November 2006, Zalm announced in the Sunday morning talk show Buitenhof that he would step down from politics and would probably seek employment in the private sector. Three months after his 2007 retirement from politics, Zalm went to work for DSB Bank, a company that he had criticized in his earlier role as finance minister for what he considered misleading advertising for consumer credit. He initially held the position of chief economist, but quickly became CFO of the faltering bank after the Dutch central bank DNB had threatened to curtail DSB's financial autonomy.

On 21 November 2008 it was announced by Prime minister Jan Peter Balkenende that Zalm will be the new CEO of the bank resulting from the merger of ABN and Fortis Netherlands, two recently nationalized banks. This new position came under scrutiny after Zalm's previous employer DSB went bankrupt in 2009. The Netherlands Authority for the Financial Markets (AFM) and the central bank both investigated Zalm's role in DSB's final years, with AFM concluding that he was "not competent" and should be dismissed from ABN AMRO's board, while DNB decided to keep Zalm in his position. In September 2016, Zalm announced that he would step down in 2017 as chairman of the executive board of ABN AMRO.

Since 2013, Zalm had served as a non-executive director at Royal Dutch Shell. In the same year, he also became a member of the board of the credit rating agency Moody's. On 1 January 2018, Zalm was appointed chairman of the advisory board of Statistics Netherlands (Centraal Bureau voor de Statistiek, CBS), succeeding Inge Brakman. On 1 January 2024, Zalm stepped down and was succeeded by Menno Snel.

=== Personal ===
Zalm grew up in the New Apostolic Church but left the church and later became agnostic. Zalm is a fan of the game of pinball and during his second term as Minister of Finance he had a pinball machine in his department. He is an honorary member of the Dutch Pinball Association. In 2004 he had a cameo appearance in the movie Cool! by Theo van Gogh. In January 2019, in an episode of the Dutch version of Who Do You Think You Are?, it became known that Zalm is related to rebel leader and pirate Pier Gerlofs Donia, through his mother's family.

== Decorations ==
Honours
Ribbon bar	Honour	Country	Date	Comment
	Knight Commander of the Order of Merit	Germany	21 March 1996	
	Grand Cross of the Order of Leopold II	Belgium	24 December 1999	
	Grand Officer of the Order of the Oak Crown	Luxembourg	10 December 2003	
	Knight Grand Cross of the Order of Merit	Italy	15 September 2005	
	Grand Officer of the Legion of Honour	France	8 May 2006	
	Commander of the Order of Orange-Nassau	Netherlands	11 April 2007	Elevated from Officer (10 December 2002)
	Grand Officer of the Order of the Crown	Belgium	1 August 2010	

== Honorary degrees ==
Honorary degrees
University	Field	Country	Date	Comment
Vrije Universiteit Amsterdam	Economics	Netherlands	20 October 2008	

Party political offices
Preceded by Hans Dijkstal	Leader of the People's Party for Freedom and Democracy; 2002–2004	Succeeded by Jozias van Aartsen
Preceded by Hans Dijkstal	Parliamentary leader of the People's Party for Freedom and Democracy in the House of Representatives; 2002–2003	Succeeded by Jozias van Aartsen
Preceded by Hans Dijkstal; 2002	Lead candidate of the People's Party for Freedom and Democracy; 2003	Succeeded by Mark Rutte; 2006
Political offices
Preceded by Wim Kok	Minister of Finance; 1994–1996	Succeeded by Hans Wijers; Ad interim
Preceded by Hans Wijers; Ad interim	Minister of Finance; 1996–2002	Succeeded by Hans Hoogervorst
Preceded by Hans Hoogervorst	Minister of Finance; 2003–2007	Succeeded by Wouter Bos
Preceded by Johan Remkes; Roelf de Boer	Deputy Prime Minister of the Netherlands; 2003–2007; Served alongside: Thom de Graaf (2003–2005); Laurens Jan Brinkhorst (2005–2006)	Succeeded by Wouter Bos; André Rouvoet
Preceded by Laurens Jan Brinkhorst	Minister of Economic Affairs; Ad interim 2006	Succeeded by Joop Wijn
Civic offices
Preceded by Peter de Ridder	Director of the Bureau for Economic Policy Analysis; 1989–1994	Succeeded by Henk Don
Preceded by Inge Brakman	Chairman of the supervisory board of Statistics Netherlands; 2017–present	Incumbent
Business positions
Unknown	CFO of the DSB Bank; 2007–2009	Succeeded by Frank de Grave
Preceded by Rijkman Groenink	CEO and Chairman of the board of directors of ABN AMRO; 2009–2017	Succeeded by Kees van Dijkhuizen
New title	CEO and Chairman of the board of directors of Fortis Bank Nederland; 2010	Office discontinued
New title	CEO and Chairman of the board of directors of the ABN AMRO Group; 2010–2017	Succeeded by Kees van Dijkhuizen
Unknown	Vice Chairman of the supervisory board of the Danske Bank; 2019–present	Incumbent
