= Cees Veerman =

Dutch politician (born 1949)

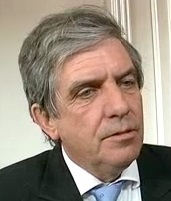
- Veerman in 2007

Minister of Agriculture, Nature and Food Quality
- In office 1 July 2003 – 22 February 2007
- Prime Minister: Jan Peter Balkenende
- Preceded by: Himself as Minister of Agriculture, Nature and Fisheries
- Succeeded by: Gerda Verburg

Minister of Agriculture, Nature and Fisheries
- In office 22 July 2002 – 1 July 2003
- Prime Minister: Jan Peter Balkenende
- Preceded by: Laurens Jan Brinkhorst
- Succeeded by: Himself as Minister of Agriculture, Nature and Fisheries<

Member of the Social and Economic Council
- In office 1 January 1990 – 1 January 1993
- Chairman: Theo Quené

Personal details
- Born: Cornelis Pieter Veerman; 8 March 1949 (age 77) Nieuw-Beijerland, Netherlands
- Party: Christian Democratic Appeal (since 1980)
- Other political affiliations: Christian Historical Union (until 1980)
- Education: Erasmus University Rotterdam (Bachelor of Economics, Master of Economics); Wageningen University (Doctor of Philosophy)
- Occupation: Politician · Civil servant · Economist · Researcher · Corporate director · Nonprofit director · Academic administrator · Farmer · Professor

Cornelis Pieter "Cees" Veerman (born 8 March 1949) is a retired Dutch politician of the Christian Democratic Appeal (CDA) party and economist.

Veerman applied at the Rotterdam School of Economics in May 1967 majoring in Economics obtaining a Bachelor of Economics degree in June 1969 working as a student researcher before obtaining a Master of Economics degree in July 1973. Veerman worked as an economics teacher in Delft from October 1971 until January 1976. Veerman served on the Municipal Council of Nieuw-Beijerland from May 1973 until June 1980 and on the Municipal Council of Korendijk from February 1986 until September 1991. Veerman worked as an associate professor of economics at the Erasmus University Rotterdam from January 1976 until September 1989. Veerman applied at the Wageningen University in April 1979 for a postgraduate education in Economics working as a researcher and got a doctorate as a Doctor of Philosophy in Agricultural economics in August 1983. Veerman worked as a distinguished professor of Agricultural economics at the Tilburg University from September 1989 until July 2002 and as a distinguished professor of Agricultural economics and Public administration at the Erasmus University Rotterdam from May 1990 until August 1997. Veerman also became active in the private sector and public sector and occupied numerous seats as a corporate director and nonprofit director on several boards of directors and supervisory boards (Ernst & Young, LEI Wageningen UR and the General Bank of the Netherlands) and served on several state commissions and councils on behalf of the government (Social and Economic Council). Veerman also served as Chairman of the Education board of the Wageningen University from 1 May 1997 until 22 July 2002.

== Biography ==
=== Early life ===
Veerman attended Erasmus University in Rotterdam, then went on to attain a doctorate degree of economic science at Wageningen University in 1983.

After attaining his degree, Veerman taught economics at a secondary school. In 1989 he taught agricultural business economics and sociology at Tilburg University. A year later, Veerman became a professor of agribusiness at his alma mater, Erasmus University, then in 1997, became chairman of the board of management at Wageningen University.

=== Politics ===
Veerman served as the Minister of Agriculture, Nature and Food Quality for the Netherlands in the third. He was also President of the EU Council of Agriculture Ministers. Some of the key issues he was focused on include the relationship between agriculture and society (especially combating poverty), the relationship between farming and nature, and reforms for the EU's Common Agricultural Policy (CAP), which includes the feud over European farm aid. He is very influential in international environmental affairs. He was succeeded by Gerda Verburg on 22 February 2007.

=== Trivia ===
he sat as a member on various supervisory boards throughout his career. Some of these boards include the National Cooperative Council for Agricultural and Horticulture, the board of the Horticultural Auction Association, the DLO Agricultural Economics Research Institute, the Moret, Ernst & Young advisory board, the Nieuw-Beijerland municipal council for the Christian Democratic Alliance (CDA), and the Social and Economic Council.

== Decorations ==
Honours
Ribbon bar	Honour	Country	Date	Comment
	Officer of the Order of Orange-Nassau	Netherlands	11 April 2007	

Political offices
Preceded by Laurens Jan Brinkhorst	Minister of Agriculture, Nature and Fisheries; 2002–2003	Succeeded by Himself as Minister of Agriculture, Nature and Food Quality
Preceded by Himself as Minister of Agriculture, Nature and Fisheries	Minister of Agriculture, Nature and Food Quality; 2003–2007	Succeeded by Gerda Verburg
Business positions
Preceded by Pieter Bouw	Chairman of the VU University Medical Center; 2012–2013	Succeeded by Wouter Bos
Non-profit organization positions
Preceded by Herman Wijffels	Chairman of the Vereniging Natuurmonumenten; 2007–2011	Succeeded by Hans Wijers
Academic offices
Unknown	President of the Wageningen University; 1997–2002	Unknown
