= Leslie Fielding =

British diplomat (1932–2021)

Sir Leslie Fielding KCMG (29 July 1932 – 4 March 2021) was a British diplomat. In the Diplomatic Service, he spent time in the Foreign Office in London before serving as the European Commission Ambassador to Tokyo between 1978 and 1982. He was Director-General for external relations at the European Commission from 1982 to 1987.

== Early life ==
Fielding was the son of Percy Fielding and Margaret Calder. He was educated at Emmanuel College, Cambridge and the School of Oriental and African Studies, where he studied Persian.

== Career ==
Fielding spent seven years in the Foreign Office in London, as well as serving political assignments in overseas embassies in Tehran, Singapore, Phnom Penh and Paris. He joined the European Commission in 1973 and was the Ambassador to Tokyo between 1978 and 1982. Upon his return from Japan, he became the Director-General for external relations at the European Commission. Fielding was knighted in 1988. He was a non-executive director of IBM (Europe) and a special adviser to Panasonic. Between 1987 and 1992 he was Vice-Chancellor of the University of Sussex.

He was a patron of the Society of King Charles the Martyr. He was created Companion of the Roll of Honour of the Memorial of Merit of King Charles the Martyr in 2019.

== Death ==
Sir Leslie died on 4 March 2021 after a short illness.

== Publications ==
- Europe as a global partner: the external relations of the European Community, University Association for Contemporary European Studies, London, 1989. ISBN 0906384303
- Before the Killing Fields: Witness to Cambodia and the Vietnam War, I.B.Tauris, 2007. ISBN 1845114930
- "Kindly call me God": the misadventures of 'Fielding of the FO', Eurocrat extraordinaire and vice-chancellor semipotentiary, Boermans Books, 2009. ISBN 0956216714
- Twilight over the Temples: the close of Cambodia's Belle Epoque, Boermans Books, 2011. ISBN 0956216722
- The Mistress of the Bees: a novel, Boermans Books, 2011. ISBN 0956216730
- Mentioned in despatches: Phnom Penh, Paris, Tokyo, Brussels: is diplomacy dead?, Boermans Books, 2012. ISBN 0956216749
- Is Diplomacy Dead? Boermans Books, 2014. ISBN 9780956216755
- When The EU Going Was Good Boermans Books, 2020 ISBN 9780956216786
