= Demissionary cabinet =

Type of caretaker government in the Netherlands

A demissionary cabinet (Dutch: demissionair kabinet) is a type of caretaker cabinet or provisional government in the Netherlands.

== Overview ==
The Dutch demissionary cabinet continues the current government after a cabinet has ended. This can either be after completion of the full term, between general elections (when the new House of Representatives is installed) and the formation of a new cabinet, or after a cabinet crisis. In both cases the prime minister hands in the resignation of his cabinet to the Dutch monarch. The monarch will not accept full resignation until a new cabinet has been formed. Between the moment in which the prime minister hands in the resignation and the monarch installs a new cabinet, the cabinet is labelled demissionary. As a demissionary cabinet is considered a continuation of the previous cabinet, it is not counted as a new cabinet (e.g. Balkenende IV did not become Balkenende V when becoming demissionary).

By constitutional convention, a demissionary cabinet has fewer powers than a conventional cabinet. Besides organising elections, the main aim of a demissionary cabinet is to take care of ongoing business until the new cabinet comes into power. Thus, it can only take care of urgent and pressing matters and not initiate controversial legislation. The States General decides which affairs are urgent and pressing, and which are deemed controversial. It is a custom (which is not always followed) that the opinion of minority parties is taken into account for these decisions. However, there is no consensus at this time on what is considered pressing matters, or controversial legislation. A demissionary cabinet is different from an interim cabinet.

A demissionary cabinet takes care of policy during elections and cabinet formation. This is relevant as the formation process can take, in comparative terms, a very long time. An example of a very long-lasting caretaker government was the cabinet Den Uyl between 22 March and 18 December 1977, during the formation of the cabinet Van Agt-I. The first Balkenende Cabinet (2002–2003) had a demissionary phase more than twice as long as its period as a normal cabinet (7 months compared to a mere 3 months). In 2017, a demissionary cabinet kept office between March 15 and October 26 and was allowed by the senate to follow through with its legislative agenda. The third Rutte cabinet held the record for the longest demissionary cabinet in Dutch history, at 225 days.

In the case of a cabinet crisis and dissolution, one of these options will apply to the demissionary, or caretaker, cabinet:

1. The complete cabinet stays in post until a new cabinet is formed (e.g. all the ministers of Netherlands cabinet Kok-2 stayed on as a demissionary cabinet after the fall of the cabinet over Srebrenica).
2. Part of the cabinet remains in position until a new cabinet is formed (example: only CDA and CU ministers of Netherlands cabinet Balkenende-4 stayed on as a demissionary cabinet after the resignation of the PvdA ministers over Uruzgan).
3. An official minority cabinet (without demissionary status) is formed after the dissolution of the cabinet. The main task of this minority cabinet would be organising the elections. It would, however, have more authority in proposing new laws and policies compared to a demissionary cabinet. The new cabinet is seen as a successor rather than the continuation of the fallen cabinet (example Netherlands cabinet Balkenende III followed up on Netherlands cabinet Balkenende II).

== See also ==
- Rump cabinet
