= Annelies Verstand =

Dutch politician (born 1949)

Annelies Elisabeth Verstand-Bogaert (born 8 October 1949, Oostburg) is a Dutch politician.
