= 2006 in the Netherlands =

- Decades: 1980s; 1990s; 2000s; 2010s; 2020s
- See also: Other events of 2006; History of the Netherlands

This article lists some of the events that took place in the Netherlands in 2006.

== Incumbents ==
- Monarch: Beatrix of the Netherlands
- Prime Minister: Jan Peter Balkenende

== Events ==
=== January ===
- January 1: A redivision of local government in South Holland and Utrecht comes into effect. Eleven existing municipalities are merged to form three new municipalities.
- January 4: Prostitution in Arnhem's red light district, the Spijkerkwartier, ends. All prostitutes move to an industrial area on the outskirts of the city.
- January 8: The remains of four babies are discovered in the backyard of a house in Beverwijk, North Holland. The woman living the house is arrested on suspicion of killing her four newborn children.
- January 9: Protesters are removed from a forest in Schinveld, Limburg. The forest is cut down to facilitate airplanes landing at the NATO air force base in Geilenkirchen, Germany.
- January 21: De Telegraaf newspaper reports that criminals have gotten hold of state secrets of the General Intelligence and Security Service.
- January 30: Willem Holleeder, kidnapper of Freddy Heineken in 1983, is arrested on suspicion of extortion of several real estate magnates, including murdered Willem Endstra. Holleeder is also suspected of leading one of the organized crime entities in Amsterdam.

=== February ===
- February 1: An apartment complex on the Bos en Lommerplein, Amsterdam is evacuated as tests indicate that the building is about to collapse. Local authorities declare the building unfit for habitation, while the constructor offers the residents alternative housing.
- February 2: The House of Representatives votes in favour of the ISAF operation of the Netherlands Army in Orūzgān Province, Afghanistan.
- February 3: Boris Dittrich resigns as fractievoorzitter of D66. He had indicated that his party would leave the government coalition if the mission to Afghanistan were approved, but said during the debate that this was a strategic remark aimed at swaying the opposition Labour Party to oppose the mission. This failed, and the admission led to widespread criticism within D66.
- February 6: The Dutch government announces that it will return the art collection of Jacques Goudstikker to his heirs. The works of art had been confiscated by the Nazis during the Second World War. The Dutch government confiscated the works from the Nazi government in 1945 as "enemy assets."

=== March ===
- March 1: The new health insurance system comes into force. The difference between private and mutual funds is lifted.
- March 6: Milan Babić, former president of the Republic of Serbian Krajina, commits suicide in the detention unit of the International Criminal Tribunal for the former Yugoslavia in The Hague.
- March 7: Dutch municipal elections, 2006: The winning parties are Labour Party and Socialist Party. fractievoorzitter Jozias van Aartsen of the VVD resigns after his party loses many seats.
- March 10: Hofstad Network trial: Jason Walters and Ismail Akhnikh are convicted for membership of a terrorist organisation, for attempted murder and for illegal firearms possession. Walters received a 15-year prison sentence, while Akhnikh is sentenced to 13 years in prison.
- March 11: Slobodan Milosevic, former president of Serbia and Yugoslavia, is found dead in the detention unit of the International Criminal Tribunal for the former Yugoslavia in The Hague.

=== April ===
- April 1: The party council of GreenLeft repeals the expulsion of Senate member Sam Pormes. He had been expelled from the party after lying about his involvement in terrorist activities.
- April 20: Pub owner Thomas van der Bijl is shot dead outside his pub in Amsterdam. According to reports in De Telegraaf, police suspect that Van der Bijl had been involved in a failed smuggle of 30,000 kilos of narcotics. Van der Bijl was also believed to be a key prosecution witness in the trial against Willem Holleeder.
- April 24: Medical authorities suspend the permit of the Radboud hospital in Nijmegen, Gelderland to perform heart surgeries, after an investigation reveals that the hospital fails the criteria.

=== May ===
- May 6: The Netherlands military base in Seedorf, Lower Saxony, Germany is closed.
- May 16: Minister for Integration and Immigration Rita Verdonk says during a debate that Ayaan Hirsi Ali is not a Dutch citizen, after reports that she had lied about her name and situation during her asylum application. Hirsi Ali immediately leaves the House of Representatives
- May 30: Wilhelm Schippers is sentenced to eight years in prison and forced treatment in a psychiatric institution. Schippers had fled from his forced treatment in the Veldzicht clinic in Balkbrug, Overijssel while on a leave, and killed a 73-year-old man in Amsterdam while on the run. The case leads to a review of all leaves from forced treatments.
- May 31: Members of the VVD choose Mark Rutte as the new lijsttrekker of the party in an internal election. He defeats Rita Verdonk and Jelleke Veenendaal.
- May 31: The Polish 1st Independent Parachute Brigade is awarded the Order of William, the highest military decoration in the Netherlands, for its role in Operation Market Garden. Major General Stanisław Sosabowski is posthumously awarded the Bronze Lion.

=== June ===
- June 8: Businessman Guus Kouwenhoven is sentenced to eight years in prison selling firearms to Liberian president Charles Taylor.
- June 21: Former Liberian president Charles Taylor is transferred to The Hague, to be tried there by the Special Court for Sierra Leone.
- June 24: The orthodox Christian party SGP lifts its ban on female membership. The party had lost its government subsidy because a court in The Hague found the ban on female membership to be in violation of the Convention on the Elimination of All Forms of Discrimination Against Women.
- June 24: Members of D66 choose Alexander Pechtold as the new lijsttrekker of the party in an internal election. He defeats Lousewies van der Laan.
- June 27: Minister for Integration and Immigration Rita Verdonk announces that Ayaan Hirsi Ali can retain her Dutch citizenship.
- June 30: Prime Minister Jan Peter Balkenende offers the resignation of the Second Balkenende cabinet. During a night debate, D66 fractievoorzitter Lousewies van der Laan announces that her party will leave the government in response to the way Rita Verdonk has handled the case of Ayaan Hirsi Ali's passport.

=== July ===
- July 6: Two Dutch children flee to the Dutch embassy in Damascus, Syria. They had been taken to Syria a few years earlier by their Syrian father. The children wish to be reunited with their Dutch mother, but the father insists on his paternity rights.
- July 6: The caretaker Third Balkenende cabinet, consisting of CDA and VVD, is formed.
- July 11: Wilhelm Schippers, who had been sentenced to eight years in prison and forced psychiatric treatment on May 30, commits suicide in prison.
- July 19: The International Four Days Marches Nijmegen are cancelled on the first day, after two participants die as a result of the intense heat.

=== August ===
- August 1: The ISAF Task Force Uruzgan operation of the Netherlands Army in Orūzgān Province, Afghanistan starts.
- August 1: The new spelling of the Dutch language comes into effect.
- August 6: A staircase collapses during a concert in the centre of Utrecht. One person is killed, twenty people are injured.
- August 8: The province of Groningen is hit by a magnitude 3.5 earthquake, the biggest ever to hit the region. The quake is caused by natural gas extraction from the Slochteren field.
- August 14: Businessman René van den Berg is sentenced to five years in prison for an €85 million fraud.
- August 18: Bluetongue disease is found on a farm in Kerkrade, Limburg.
- August 25: Two people are killed when lightning strikes during a funeral in Vorden, Gelderland.
- August 31: A Royal Netherlands Air Force F-16 Fighting Falcon crashes in Afghanistan, killing the 29-year-old pilot.

=== September ===
- September 13: A row starts over an interview with Minister of Justice Piet Hein Donner in the book Het land van haat en nijd (The Land of Hate and Malice). Donner says that democracy means that the sharia, Islamic legislation, can be introduced in the Netherlands as well.
- September 14: Nova broadcasts the video testament of terrorism suspect Samir Azzouz.
- September 19: Prinsjesdag: The government announces a budget surplus, the first since 2000
- September 21: The Safety Investigation Board publishes its report about the 2005 Schiphol detention centre fire. Justice Minister Piet Hein Donner and the Minister of Housing, Spatial Planning and the Environment Sybilla Dekker resign.
- September 22: Former Justice Minister Ernst Hirsch Ballin is announced as the successor of Piet Hein Donner. Former Minister of Housing, Spatial Planning and the Environment Pieter Winsemius succeeds Sybilla Dekker.

=== October ===
- October 3: Police in Rotterdam show the media the reconstruction of the head of an unknown girl, whose remains had been found in several suitcases in the Meuse. It turns out to be a 12-year-old girl from Rotterdam called Gessica. Her father is arrested on suspicion of the murder.
- October 6: The film Black Book, directed by Paul Verhoeven, wins three Golden Calf awards at the Netherlands Film Festival in Utrecht.
- October 12: Public broadcaster TROS says it considers cancelling the long running game show Lingo. An uproar follows, in which even Prime Minister Jan Peter Balkenende gets involved.
- October 13: Five marines are suspended after misbehaviour towards the local population during a training in Karasjok, Norway.
- October 30: The voting computers for the November 22 general election are disapproved in 35 municipalities.

=== November ===
- November 1: Eighteen horses drown on the Waddenzee shore near Marrum, Friesland is flooded after a storm. The other horses, over 100 in number, seek refuge on an incline in the pasture. They are guided to the mainland two days later.
- November 2: The governments of the Netherlands and the Netherlands Antilles sign an agreement disbanding the Netherlands Antilles on July 1, 2007. Curaçao and Sint Maarten will become associated states within the Kingdom of the Netherlands, while Bonaire, Saba and Sint Eustatius will become Dutch municipalities.
- November 7: The Mobiele Eenheid starts removing 25 squatters from Fort Pannerden fortress near Pannerden, Gelderland. The operation takes two days.
- November 17: De Volkskrant reports that officers of the Military Intelligence and Security Service of the Netherlands have physically abused prisoners in the Iraqi governorate of Al Muthanna.
- November 21: A passenger train and a cargo train collide at the train station of Arnhem, Gelderland. Thirty people are injured.
- November 22: Dutch general election, 2006: The 2006 general elections are won by the Socialist Party. Other winners are Christian party ChristianUnion, the far right Party for Freedom and the animal rights party Party for the Animals. The ruling Christian Democratic Appeal loses three seats, but remains the largest party. The Pim Fortuyn List, the landslide winner of the Dutch general election, 2002, loses all its seats in parliament.
- November 25: Queen Beatrix of the Netherlands appoints Rein Jan Hoekstra as the informateur for the new government. His task will be to assess the possibility of a coalition of the CDA, the Labour Party and the Socialist Party.
- November 27: A court in Amsterdam orders the coercive detention of two journalist of De Telegraaf newspaper, after they refuse to reveal the identity of their sources. The journalists had published classified information of the General Intelligence and Security Service.
- November 28: Rita Verdonk requests an investigation into the election campaign of the VVD, after the official publication of the election results. Verdonk, the number 2 on the VVD list, received more votes than the lijsttrekker Mark Rutte.
- November 30: The new House of Representatives passes a motion requesting a stop to the expulsion of around 26,000 asylum seekers who arrived in the Netherlands more than five years ago.

=== December ===
- December 1: Eight-year-old Jesse Dingemans of Hoogerheide, North Brabant, is stabbed to death inside his elementary school. A 22-year-old man from the same village is arrested near the school a few hours later on suspicion of the murder.
- December 1: Alleged Hofstad Network member Samir Azzouz is sentenced to eight years in prison for conspiring to commit a terrorist attack in the Netherlands. Three other suspects receive sentences of three to four years.
- December 6: Gerdi Verbeet (Labour Party) becomes the new President of the House of Representatives.
- December 7: TV program Nova reports that Turkish-Dutch politician Fatma Koşer Kaya (D66) has been voted into parliament after a Turkish government officials had sent an e-mail to about 200,000 Dutch citizens of Turkish origin, asking them to vote for her. Koşer Kaya, who refused to speak about the issue of the Armenian genocide, was sixth on the list of candidates for D66, but received more than enough votes to be elected to parliament directly.
- December 11: CDA, the Labour Party and the Socialist Party end their negotiations for the formation of a new government.
- December 12: The House of Representatives passes a motion of censure against Minister for Integration and Immigration Rita Verdonk, who had indicated that she would not honour the motion it had passed on November 30.
- December 13: Rita Verdonk loses the immigration portfolio after a 10-hour emergency meeting by the cabinet. The portfolio is taken over by Justice Minister Ernst Hirsch Ballin. In return, Verdonk receives the responsibility over youth care, prevention and probation.
- December 20: Herman Wijffels takes over from Rein Jan Hoekstra as the informateur for the new government. Wijffels will assess the possibility of a coalition of CDA, the Labour Party and ChristianUnion.
- December 22: Sara and Ammar, the two children who had fled to the Dutch embassy in Damascus, Syria on July 6, return to the Netherlands, after representatives of the Dutch government reach an agreement with the Syrian government and with the children's Syrian father.
- December 24: Three men are arrested on the suspicion of murdering banker Willem Endstra in 2004. The DNA of one of the suspects had been found on the presumed murder weapon.
- December 30: Talk show host Sonja Barend ends her career during a live show, after 40 years in the business. During the show, Amsterdam mayor Job Cohen announces that Barend has been awarded the title of Officer in the Order of Orange-Nassau.

== Sports ==
See worldwide 2006 in sports

- January 6: Michaëlla Krajicek and Peter Wessels reach the final of the 2006 Hopman Cup in Perth, Australia, losing against Lisa Raymond and Taylor Dent of the United States.
- January 13: Michaëlla Krajicek wins the WTA tournament in Hobart, Australia.
- January 13: Chelsea F.C. winger Arjen Robben opens the Euroborg, the new stadium of his former club FC Groningen.
- January 14: Korfball club PKC of Papendrecht, South Holland win the European Cup for the tenth time, defeating Belgian side Riviera in the final.
- January 15: Jelle Klaasen defeats Raymond van Barneveld in the final of the 2006 BDO World Darts Championship.
- January 23: Pierre van Hooijdonk signs a contract with his former club Feyenoord Rotterdam, leaving NAC Breda.
- January 29: Viswanathan Anand wins the Corus chess tournament in Wijk aan Zee, North Holland.
- January 29: Marianne Vos wins the UCI Cyclo-cross World Championships in Zeddam, Gelderland.
- February 5: The Klassieker between Feyenoord and Ajax ends in a 3–2 home victory for Feyenoord.
- February 10–12: The Netherlands lose the 2006 Davis Cup first round match against the later winners Russia 5–0.
- February 12: Ireen Wüst wins the women's 3000 metres speed skating at the 2006 Winter Olympics. Renate Groenewold wins silver.
- February 16: The Netherlands men's speed skating team pursuit team wins a bronze medal at the 2006 Winter Olympics.
- February 19: Marianne Timmer wins the women's 1000 metres speed skating at the 2006 Winter Olympics.
- February 24: Bob de Jong wins the Men's 10000 metres speed skating at the 2006 Winter Olympics.
- February 28: The rape charges against football player Robin van Persie (Arsenal) are discontinued.
- March 1: The Netherlands defeats Ecuador 1–0 in a friendly football match held in Amsterdam.
- March 8: PSV are eliminated by Olympique Lyonnais in the second round of the 2005/06 UEFA Champions League.
- March 14: Ajax are eliminated by Internazionale in the second round of the 2005/06 UEFA Champions League.
- March 25: Ellen van Dijk wins the Women's road race at the 2006 World University Cycling Championship
- March 14: Thomas Dekker wins the Tirreno-Adriatico 2006.
- March 31: Excelsior win the Eerste Divisie title by defeating rivals VVV.
- April 9: Long-distance runner Kamiel Maase wins his third Dutch marathon title, clocking 2:10:44.2 in the Rotterdam Marathon.

=== See also ===
- 2005–06 Eredivisie
- 2005–06 Eerste Divisie
- 2005–06 KNVB Cup
- 2006 Johan Cruijff Schaal

== Births ==
- April 8: Robin van Duiven, Malaysian footballer
- June 3: Countess Leonore of Orange-Nassau, Jonkvrouwe van Amsberg

== Deaths ==
=== January–June ===
- January 1: Bart Bosman, 63, biologist
- January 2: Henk de Looper, 93, field hockey player, Olympic bronze medalist
- January 4: Nel van Vliet, 79, Olympic and European swimming champion and former world record holder
- January 8: Joop van Elsen, 89, politician and resistance fighter
- January 9: Gerrie Kleton, 52, football player
- January 19: Jos Staatsen, 62, former chairman of the Royal Dutch Football Association
- January 19: Fred van der Werff, 90, retail entrepreneur
- January 22: Rick van der Linden, 59, musician, Ekseption
- January 26: Pieter Terpstra, 86, journalist and author
- February 3: Joop van der Reijden, 79, former secretary of state, former chairman of public broadcaster NOS and of commercial television station Veronica
- March 22: Ria Beckers, 67, former member of the House of Representatives for PPR and GreenLeft.
- March 25: Joop Admiraal, 68, actor
- March 25: Frits Fentener van Vlissingen, 72, entrepreneur, industrialist, billionaire. One of the richest persons in the Netherlands.
- April 3: Frédérique Huydts, 38, actress
- April 8: Gerard Reve, 82, author and poet
- April 20: Sylvia de Leur, 72, actress and comedian
- May 3: Karel Appel, 85, COBRA painter
- May 5: Marijke Höweler, 67, author
- May 6: Han Reiziger, 72, television presenter of music programmes
- May 21: Willem van Beusekom, 59, television presenter
- June 5: Friso Wiegersma, 80, songwriter
- June 15: Bert Klunder, 49, comedian

=== July–December ===
- July 7: Rudi Carrell, 71, TV show host
- July 11: Wilhelm Schippers, 41, criminal
- July 20: Theo Sijthoff, 69, cyclist and fashion designer
- August 1: Johannes Willebrands, 96, cardinal, former Archbishop of Utrecht.
- August 1: Krijn Torringa, 66, radio dj
- August 21: Paul Fentener van Vlissingen, 65, entrepreneur, industrialist, billionaire, philanthropist. One of the richest persons in the Netherlands.
- October 22: Paul Biegel, 81, author.
- November 26: Cri Stellweg, 84, columnist.
- December 2: Mariska Veres, 59, singer of Shocking Blue.
- December 14: Robert Long, 63, singer.
- December 23: Frans Haks, 68, art historian and museum director.

== See also ==
- 2006 in Dutch television
