= 2006 in Dutch television =

This is a list of Dutch television related events from 2006.

== Events ==
- 11 March - Raffaëla Paton wins the third series of Idols, becoming the show's first female winner.
- 12 March - Treble are selected to represent Netherlands at the 2006 Eurovision Song Contest with their song "Amambanda". They are selected to be the forty-seventh Dutch Eurovision entry during Nationaal Songfestival held at Heineken Music Hall in Amsterdam.
- 14 May - Speed skater Barbara de Loor and her partner Marcus van Teijlingen win the second series of Dancing with the Stars.
- 28 October - Launch of the Dutch version of The X Factor.
- 27 November - Jeroen Visser wins the sixth and final series of Big Brother.

== Debuts ==
- 28 October - X Factor (2006–present)

== Television shows ==
=== 1950s ===
- NOS Journaal (1956–present)

=== 1970s ===
- Sesamstraat (1976–present)

=== 1980s ===
- Jeugdjournaal (1981–present)
- Het Klokhuis (1988–present)

=== 1990s ===
- Goede tijden, slechte tijden (1990–present)
- De Club van Sinterklaas (1999-2009)

=== 2000s ===
- Idols (2002-2008, 2016–present)
- Dancing with the Stars (2005-2009)

== Ending this year ==
- Big Brother (1999-2006)

== Networks and services ==
=== Launches ===
Network	Type	Launch date	Notes	Source
iConcerts	Cable television	Unknown		
Film 1.1	Cable television	1 February		
Film 1.2	Cable television	1 February		
Film 1.3	Cable television	1 February		
Action Now!	Cable television	16 June		
MTV Brand New	Cable television	1 August		
Cultura	Cable television	1 September		
BBC Entertainment	Cable television	1 October		
Zone Horror	Cable television	30 October		
101 TV	Cable television	31 October		
Politiek 24	Cable television	November		
Al Jazeera English	Cable television	15 November		
Humor TV	Cable television	15 November		
HilversumBest	Cable television	1 December		
The Box Comedy	Cable television	1 December		

=== Conversions and rebrandings ===
Old network name	New network name	Type	Conversion Date	Notes	Source
[[]]		Cable and satellite			

=== Closures ===
Network	Type	End date	Notes	Sources
[[]]	Cable and satellite			

== See also ==
- 2006 in the Netherlands
