= 2006–2007 Dutch cabinet formation =

Following the 2006 Dutch general election, held on November 22, a process of cabinet formation started, involving negotiations about which coalition partners to form a common programme of policy and to divide the posts in cabinet. On February 22, 2007 it resulted in the formation of the Fourth Balkenende cabinet.

== Background ==
=== Election results ===
The Dutch House of Representatives has 150 seats. In the 2006 elections the coalition partners of the cabinet in power before the fall of that cabinet earlier that year lost a total of 12 seats. Christian Democratic Appeal (CDA) lost three out of 44, the right-wing liberal People's Party for Freedom and Democracy (VVD) lost six out of 28 and the centre-left liberal D66 lost three of six. Nevertheless, the CDA remained the largest party in the parliament with 41 seats. The main opposition party, the social-democratic Labour Party (PvdA) lost nine of its 42 seats; getting 33 seats in the new parliament. The largest winner in seats was the Socialist Party (SP), which won 16 seats, increasing from nine to 25 seats. Two previously unrepresented parties were also successful; the far right-wing Party for Freedom (PVV) of former VVD MP Geert Wilders, winning nine seats, and the animal-rights Party for the Animals, winning two seats. The social, and orthodox Protestant, ChristianUnion (CU) doubled its seats from three to six. GreenLeft (GL) dropped from eight to seven seats, while the orthodox Reformed Political Reformed Party (SGP) remained stable with two seats.

=== Caretaker cabinet ===
The cabinet fell because D66 stepped out. The resulting Balkenende III cabinet no longer had a majority in parliament. Like any minority cabinet it had to negotiate with parties that were not member of the governing coalition for a majority of its bills, including the budgets. As is conventional, just before the elections the cabinet officially became a caretaker cabinet, with limited powers.

On November 30, 2006 the new parliament was sworn in, including several members of the current demissionair cabinet (Balkenende, Verdonk, van der Hoeven, Wijn, van Geel, Kamp, Remkes among others). Because of the election results, this House of Representatives had a majority of parties that opposed the course of the third Balkenende cabinet on important issues. One important election issue was an amnesty for a specific group of asylum seekers. This group originally of 26,000 and later 38,000 people had been in an administrative process since 2001, many of their children were raised exclusively in the Netherlands. The Minister for Integration and Immigration Rita Verdonk was currently looking into each of these dossiers to assess their future: either an expulsion or permanent residence. On December 1 the new House of Representatives adopted a motion in favour of amnestying this group. Balkenende reacted with annoyance as he stated that this ad hoc left wing coalition (including PvdA and SP) was no good basis for negotiations for a stable government. On December 5, the cabinet announced that it refused to execute this motion. It had three reasons for this: first, it claimed that a parliament which deals with a caretaker cabinet cannot demand that cabinet to implement new policy; second, it argued that a general amnesty would only attract more asylum seekers and it also raised several questions on which specific groups of asylum seekers should be amnestied and what the legal consequences would be for other groups not included in the amnesty. Minister Verdonk did announce that the expulsion would be suspended until the next parliamentary debate. A majority in the House of Representatives now proposed stopping the expulsion of asylum seekers until the formation talks were finished and allowing the formation talks to solve this issue; again the minister refused to execute this. On December 13, the House of Representatives decided to respond to this unwillingness with a motion of no confidence specifically aimed at Minister Verdonk. The leader of the VVD, Mark Rutte announced that if Minister Verdonk were forced to leave the cabinet all VVD ministers would leave, leaving only seven CDA ministers in the cabinet. On December 14, the cabinet held a meeting on how to respond to this motion: it found the solution in a small reshuffle of portfolios between Verdonk and Ernst Hirsch Ballin, the Minister of Justice, who became responsible for migration, while Verdonk became responsible for youth criminality. Hirsch Ballin could then partially execute the motion of the House of Representatives for a temporary stop in expulsion, and the VVD would be allowed to voice its opposition to this decision, breaking the principle that cabinets speak with one voice.

== Information rounds ==
On 24 and 25 November the chairs of parliamentary parties of the House of Representatives gave advice to the Queen on who should be appointed informateur and who should be involved in the first information talks. Sometimes the information and formation is fairly straightforward. However, after the November 2006 elections an elongated and complicated information and formation period is foreseen by most commentators.

An extra complicating factor is that, provincial elections will be held in March 2007, only four months after the general election. These are also indirect elections for the Senate and any coalition will be stronger if it has a majority in both chambers. However, with many voters afloat, the result for those elections might be significantly different from these general elections. This is even more the case since disagreement with any formed coalition cabinet may directly reflect upon the results in that upcoming election.

Some politicians have already expressed their views on what the options should be if it is impossible to forge a CDA-PvdA-SP cabinet. Prominent VVD-members Gerrit Zalm and Atzo Nicolaï proposed a parliamentary minority cabinet; while Party for the Animals leader Marianne Thieme indicated that she preferred a minority PvdA-SP-GL cabinet which may be supported by several environmentalist, liberal and social parties. This would be a novum in Dutch politics. Nicolaï stated that a minority cabinet would be the most democratic option because for each proposed law a proposal-specific majority has to be gathered for it to pass the chamber vote.

=== Exploratory information rounds ===
The CDA offered to provide the informateur which should explore as many possible coalitions as possible. The PvdA proposed that someone unconnected to a political party should provide the informateur, and that the first negotiations should be focussed on the SP besides the CDA who won the elections. The PvdA has stated it doesn't want to form a coalition without the SP. GreenLeft also advised that SP should be involved and recommended Doekle Terpstra, former chair of the Christian trade union CNV as informateur. The SP advised the Queen to appoint D66 Minister of State Hans van Mierlo as informateur and examine the possibilities for a SP, PvdA and CDA coalition. The VVD, D66 and ChristianUnion gave the advice to appoint a CDA informateur. The SGP proposed a coalition between the CDA, PvdA and ChristianUnion, explicitly suggesting CDA member Rein Jan Hoekstra as the informateur who was involved as informateur in the 2003 Dutch cabinet formation. In the late afternoon of 25 November 2006, Queen Beatrix appointed Rein Jan Hoekstra as informateur.

Hoekstra had his first discussion with the larger parties on November 28. He held talks with the smaller parties the next day. Rouvoet, of the ChristianUnion, made clear that a cabinet of CDA-PvdA-SP looks like the most obvious coalition. Subsequently, Hoekstra continued his talks with a CDA-PvdA-SP coalition in mind .

After introductory talks on December 6 between Marijnissen (SP) and Balkenende (CDA), it was acknowledged that the formation of an CDA-SP-PvdA cabinet would be difficult as their viewpoints are far apart. Both of them also shared the opinion that the balance in this coalition may, with the largest, centre oriented, party (CDA) being smaller than the combined two leftwing parties (SP-PvdA), complicate the formation of such a cabinet On December 8 the informateur announced a brief postponement in the negotiations as a result of an apparent stalemate. The PvdA insisted on the SP as a coalition partner but SP and CDA agreed that the two parties had little in common especially on issues such as distribution of income, military peacekeeping missions one of them Task Force Uruzgan and European integration. At the same time it is expected that CDA would prefer participation of CU over SP. But if the PvdA would enter a government with SP in the opposition, it might lose even more seats to that party in the next elections.

On December 11 Hoekstra started a new information round without SP participation after consulting with Balkenende, Bos and Marijnissen. The parties involved agreed that the differences between CDA and SP were too large. Marijnissen did not express regrets as he expects to be involved again in a later stage in the formation a possible PvdA, SP, GreenLeft coalition. Hoekstra will now consult with all the parliamentary group representatives in order to identify a suitable SP replacement, which according to analysts will be ChristianUnion or GreenLeft or both.

On December 12 Wouter Bos expressed his doubts whether further discussions would be fruitful as in his view CDA was not prepared to change course. In his words he did not intent to "fall in the same trap" as in the 2003 Dutch cabinet formation. He suggested that negotiations from now on should be of more substance and with additional informateurs. Femke Halsema (GL) on December 13 also walked away from a possible coalition with GL and PvdA. She had three reasons for doing so: the differences between CDA and GL on economic, environmental and cultural issues; the fact that all three parties lost seats in the elections; and the fact that the GreenLeft as smallest party of the three would be unlikely to get any substantial concessions from the CDA and the PvdA. By 17 December it had become clear that at this stage in the formation the combination CDA-PvdA-CU is the most likely. Hoekstra finished his mission on the exploratory information round.

=== Second information round ===
In the second information round the wishes, similarities and potential problems in forming a cabinet CDA-PvdA-CU are explored by a new informateur. While the PvdA voiced a preference for several informateurs operating in parallel in this next round, the CDA preferred a single person. Both the PvdA and the CU accepted the esteemed CDA member, and former chair of the Social Economic Council Herman Wijffels as the single informateur. Importantly, Wijffels is a known advocate for the phased abolition of the existing practice of tax deduction on housing mortgages, a potential wedge between CDA (against) and PvdA/CU (support). Two other potential stumbling blocks in this phase of the proceedings continued to make headlines: existing abortion laws and the future of social welfare for the elderly. The CU, who from their Christian morals feel obliged to defend the unborn, would not go as far as to seek reversal of abortion laws but would find opportunities within existing legislation to curb it. The current law dating back to 1981 only allows abortion when a pregnant woman decides she is at serious health risk. In everyday practice however the decision is left entirely to the woman regardless of the precise argumentation and forcing legislation to use the exact wording of the law is where the CU might achieve its aims, although the PvdA sees this as a problem. One of the main election themes of the PvdA concerned the future financing of social welfare for the elderly given a projected 23% of people over 65 years of age in 2040 (2006:14%). The PvdA advocated some taxation for affluent elderly, something the CDA is against.

There are some personal similarities that may facilitate successful negotiation, for example, the three party leaders have in common that they all graduated from Free University of Amsterdam giving the coalition talks a certain reformed edge.

In a special parliamentary session on December 19 devoted to the coalition talks, PvdA, D66 and GreenLeft voiced their displeasure with the SP for walking away from the talks in an earlier phase

==== Negotiations ====
On December 21, the negotiators for the three parties, Jan Peter Balkenende (CDA), Wouter Bos (PvdA) and André Rouvoet (ChristenUnie) agreed with informateur Wijffels to start the actual coalition talks on January 3, 2007. These started in a secret location, which was quickly revealed by De Telegraaf as the manor house Lauswolt in Beetsterzwaag, Friesland. All negotiators had brought along a second: Maxime Verhagen (CDA), Jacques Tichelaar (PvdA) and Arie Slob (CU). On Friday, January 5, Balkenende, Bos and Rouvoet announced that they would continue the talks to be held on different (secret) locations in the country, with the intention to have a new cabinet before the Provincial elections on March 7, 2007. On January 11 it was rumoured that Bos was in for the position of Minister of Finance and that of Deputy Prime Minister as the successor of Gerrit Zalm. This would be remarkable because Bos in the election campaign more than once expressed his ambition to remain in parliament as parliamentary leader rather than to serve in a cabinet led by Balkenende. A few days later on January 17 Bos denied the rumour. On that same day the three prospective cabinet partners continued their talks at a military facility in Hilversum (again not a secret location as anticipated) and not in The Hague. Due to the lack of any substantial news in this part of the formation, the conference table Wijffels selected for the talks made the headlines. Apparently he is fond of it and it travels with him whatever the location.

The formation talks already started to leave their mark on the ongoing parliamentary deliberations: On January 18 the CU voted down a motion seeking to the curb of advertisements for alcohol with the understanding that this issue was already part of the formation negotiations. In week 10 after the general elections, talks continued in The Hague again with little news to report. On January 24 a plan leaked to reduce the number of cabinet ministers. and a week later a plan for the reduction of the number of civil servants by 10,000. Even more leaks and speculations followed on January 29 when it was reported that a (record breaking) 40 page agreement was in the making to be presented on February 2. According to the accountants and statisticians at the Centraal Planbureau on January 31 new policies in this agreement would be paid for by anticipating higher economic growth than the officially projected one much to the dismay of the outgoing VVD finance minister Zalm. Also on January 31 the ministerial ambitions of Wouter Bos became an issue for the third time in the formation process and on this occasion his party and a parliamentary majority formally requested him to accept the vice-prime ministership. On the same day a PvdA minority group led by renegade Diederik Samson urged him to keep his election promise. In Samson's view only the other left-wing parties would benefit from a submissive PvdA fraction with Bos a member of the cabinet.

Nearly a month after this round of talks started, Wijffels on February 2 was able to announce its conclusion with a provisional agreement which was presented to the parliamentary fractions on February 5. Again some details leaked: the continuation of the tax deduction on housing mortgages much desired by CDA, the housing rent freezing and a form of taxation on early retirement as a defence against the costs of population ageing as desired by PvdA although effective after 2011.

=== Preliminary coalition agreement ===
The three parliamentary fractions of CDA, PvdA and CU met on February 5 to discuss behind closed doors the preliminary agreement. Large parts of it had already been leaked to the media by then.

It led NRC Handelsblad to conclude (on that same day) that the new cabinet was not very reform-minded: a status quo on the housing market (no changes in tax deduction home owners or rent-control), partial reversal of policies of the previous government (general amnesty for asylum seekers and reintegration of people with disability benefits into the work force) or election promises not secured or watered down (subsidized instead of free child day-care, no deregulations in job security).

On February 6 the negotiators met for a final meeting in order to address some of the issues raised by their respective parliamentary fractions. The PvdA especially turned down the initial AOW agreement which led to some last minute compromising (only taxation over 18,000 euro not 15,000 euro).

In the meanwhile two political players Joop Wijn and Aart Jan de Geus both current CDA cabinet ministers announced their farewell to national politics, officially for various non-political reasons but unofficially (according to RTL Nieuws) because they were unable to secure a post in the new cabinet.

== Coalition agreement ==
The coalition agreement titled "Living together, working together" was presented on February 7 in a press conference. It is structured into six commitments of the new cabinet to an active role in world politics, to an innovative economy, to sustainable development, to social cohesion, to safety and a servile public sector. The most notable policies include:

- A reform of the system of basic state pensions: people who have private pensions of 18,000 euros and higher and who stop working before the age of 65 will pay an additional tax as of 2011. People who work beyond 65 receive tax breaks. This measure should guarantee an affordable basic state pension (AOW) despite trends in population ageing.
- The tax deduction on mortgage interest payments remains unchanged.
- Women seeking an abortion are to expect an additional waiting period between first consultation and actual procedure on top of the already mandatory 5 days waiting period
- A general amnesty for asylum seekers who entered the Netherlands before the new Asylum Law came into effect.
- The new cabinet is not in favour of a new referendum on the European Constitution voted down in 2005, but will consider new initiatives.
- 1 billion increased spending on education.
- 800 million Euros additional spending on renewable energy.

=== Reactions ===
The major opposition parties expressed their disappointment in various aspects of the agreement (some even before its actual announcement). Jan Marijnissen (SP) deplored the cancellation of a parliamentary inquiry into The Netherlands participation in the Iraq War. Femke Halsema (GL) noted that the projected taxation on environmental pollution of 1 billion euro should be 15 times as much. Both Mark Rutte (VVD) and Geert Wilders (PVV) criticised the general amnesty, Rutte fearing an influx of new asylum seekers and Wilders claiming that "the country is on the verge of collapsing". Rutte also claimed the new cabinet slogan was more like "in-stasis together, spending money together".

Both NOS News and RTL Nieuws on February 7 hailed the return of the polder model (which became marginalized with the rise of Fortuynism) as a government tool for the new cabinet as they pledged their intent to involve all sorts of organizations (employers' associations, labour unions) in their future policy making.

A parliamentary session devoted to the agreement was held on February 8 instigated by the new coalition partners but deemed not relevant by the new opposition who'd rather have had a session with the new cabinet later this month. Marijnissen mocked the proceedings by quizzing Wijffels about his conference table. On the same day the Centraal Planbureau criticised the new AOW plans as unrealistic, claiming it would involve too much paperwork.

== Formation round ==
On February 9 Jan Peter Balkenende was appointed as the formateur by the Queen. In Dutch politics his main responsibility in this capacity is filling in the vacancies in the new cabinet, the Fourth Balkenende cabinet. Two appointments were already revealed on the day the coalition agreement was announced: Wouter Bos (despite many reassurances he would never serve under Balkenende in a cabinet) as finance minister and André Rouvoet at the newly created post of youth and family minister. Both men will also act as deputy prime ministers. The new cabinet was appointed by the queen on February 22.

The parties announced the division of the government posts among the three parties on February 12:

- CDA
  - Ministries: Prime Minister (Balkenende), Social Affairs, Foreign Affairs, Public Health, Justice, Transport, Public Works and Water Management, Agriculture, and Economic Affairs.
  - State secretaries: Interior, Culture, Finance, and Defence
- Labour Party:
  - Ministries: Finance (Wouter Bos), Education, Environment, Interior, Housing and Integration (minister without portfolio), and International Development (minister without portfolio)
  - State secretaries: European Affairs, Social Affairs, Justice, Public Health, Education, and Economic Affairs
- ChristianUnion:
  - Ministries: Youth and Family (André Rouvoet, minister without portfolio), and Defence.
  - State secretaries: Transport
