= Steven van Eijck =

Dutch politician

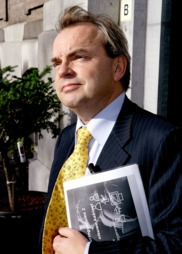

State Secretary for Finance
- In office 23 May 2002 – 30 January 2003
- Prime Minister: Jan Peter Balkenende
- Preceded by: Wouter Bos
- Succeeded by: Joop Wijn

Personal details
- Born: 4 September 1959 Rotterdam, Netherlands
- Party: Pim Fortuyn List

Steven Richard Antonius van Eijck (born 4 August 1959) is a Dutch academic, economist and former politician who served as State Secretary for Finance in the First Balkenende cabinet on behalf of the Pim Fortuyn List.

== Biography ==
Before entering politics, van Eijck studied economics at Erasmus University. He then became a lecturer in fiscal economics and financial planning at Erasmus University and was an economics teacher at the HES (Economic Studies College) in Rotterdam. During the formation of the first Balkenende cabinet, he was an advisor to the Pim Fortuyn List. For the same cabinet, he was appointed State Secretary of Finance on behalf of the LPF on 22 June 2002.

After retiring from politics, van Eijck has served as chairman of Bicycle and Automotive Industry (RAI), chairman of the Economic Development Board Rotterdam and since 2018 as a member of the Social Economic Council (SER). He is also a columnist for Algemeen Dagblad newspaper. It was announced in May 2024 that Van Eijck would take on a part-time government role as special envoy for circular economy. The Netherlands had set a target to have fully circular economy by 2050.
