= Herman Wijffels =

Dutch politician (born 1942)

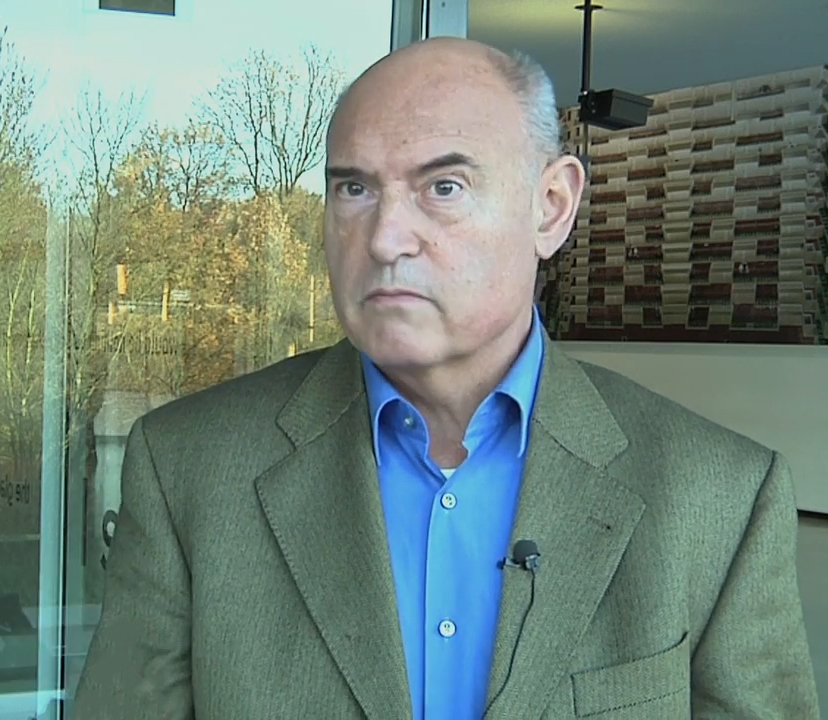
- Herman Wijffels in 2011

Chairman of the Social and Economic Council
- In office 1 January 1999 – 1 April 2006
- Preceded by: Klaas de Vries
- Succeeded by: Alexander Rinnooy Kan

Personal details
- Born: Herman H.F. Wijffels; 13 March 1942 (age 84) Turkeye, Netherlands
- Party: Christian Democratic Appeal (from 1980)
- Other political affiliations: Catholic People's Party (until 1980)
- Spouse: Herma van der Weide (m. 1970)
- Education: Tilburg University (Bachelor of Economics, Master of Economics, Doctor of Philosophy)
- Occupation: Politician · Civil servant · Economist · Financial adviser · Researcher · Businessman · Banker · Corporate director · Nonprofit director · Trade association executive · Academic administrator · Lobbyist · Author · Professor

H.H.F. "Herman" Wijffels (born 13 March 1942) is a retired Dutch politician of the Christian Democratic Appeal (CDA) party and businessman.

From 1981 to 1999 he worked for the Rabobank ultimately as chairman of the board of directors and from 15 March 1999 until 1 April 2006 he was chairman of the Social-Economic Council (Sociaal-Economische Raad, SER). From 2006 to 2008 he was the Dutch representative at the World Bank, succeeding Ad Melkert. For the 2006-2007 Dutch cabinet formation, Wijffels was recommended by informateur Rein Jan Hoekstra to lead the negotiations between the CDA, PvdA and ChristianUnion. On 22 December 2006 Queen Beatrix appointed him as Hoekstra's successor as informateur. He has been referred to as "the best prime minister the Netherlands never had".

He has been involved in supporting many causes since his retirement from the SER as his biography by Jan Smit illustrates. On leaving the SER, he demonstrated his bridging role by bringing together people from his traditional world and alternative world in a leaving event with Prof Ervin Laszlo, Dr Don Beck and Peter Merry. He repeated this with a major event focused on societal transformation in the Netherlands called Klaar om te Wenden (which translates as the sailing term "Ready About!").

== Decorations ==
Honours
Ribbon bar	Honour	Country	Date	Comment
	Knight of the Order of the Netherlands Lion	Netherlands	30 April 1991	
	Commander of the Order of Orange-Nassau	Netherlands	30 April 1995	

== Honorary degrees ==
Honorary degrees
University	Field	Country	Date	Comment
Tilburg University	Economics	Netherlands	25 November 1998	
Open University	Economics	Netherlands	13 December 2002	

Civic offices
Preceded by Klaas de Vries	Chairman of the Social and Economic Council; 1999–2006	Succeeded by Alexander Rinnooy Kan
Government offices
Preceded by Rein Jan Hoekstra; 2006–2007	Informateur; 2006–2007	Succeeded by Jan Peter Balkenende as Formateur; 2006–2007
Business positions
Preceded by Pierre Lardinois	CEO and Chairman of the Rabobank; 1986–1999	Succeeded by Hans Smits
Preceded by Ad Melkert	Executive Director of the World Bank Group; 2006–2008	Unknown
Preceded by Ad Melkert	Executive Director of the International Monetary Fund; 2006–2006	Unknown
Non-profit organization positions
Unknown	Secretary of the Christian Employers' federation 1977–1981	Unknown
Unknown	Chairman of the Vereniging Natuurmonumenten; 1999–2006	Succeeded by Cees Veerman
Academic offices
Unknown	President of the Tilburg University; 2000–2006	Succeeded by Hein van Oorschot
