= Joop Wijn =

Dutch politician (born 1969)

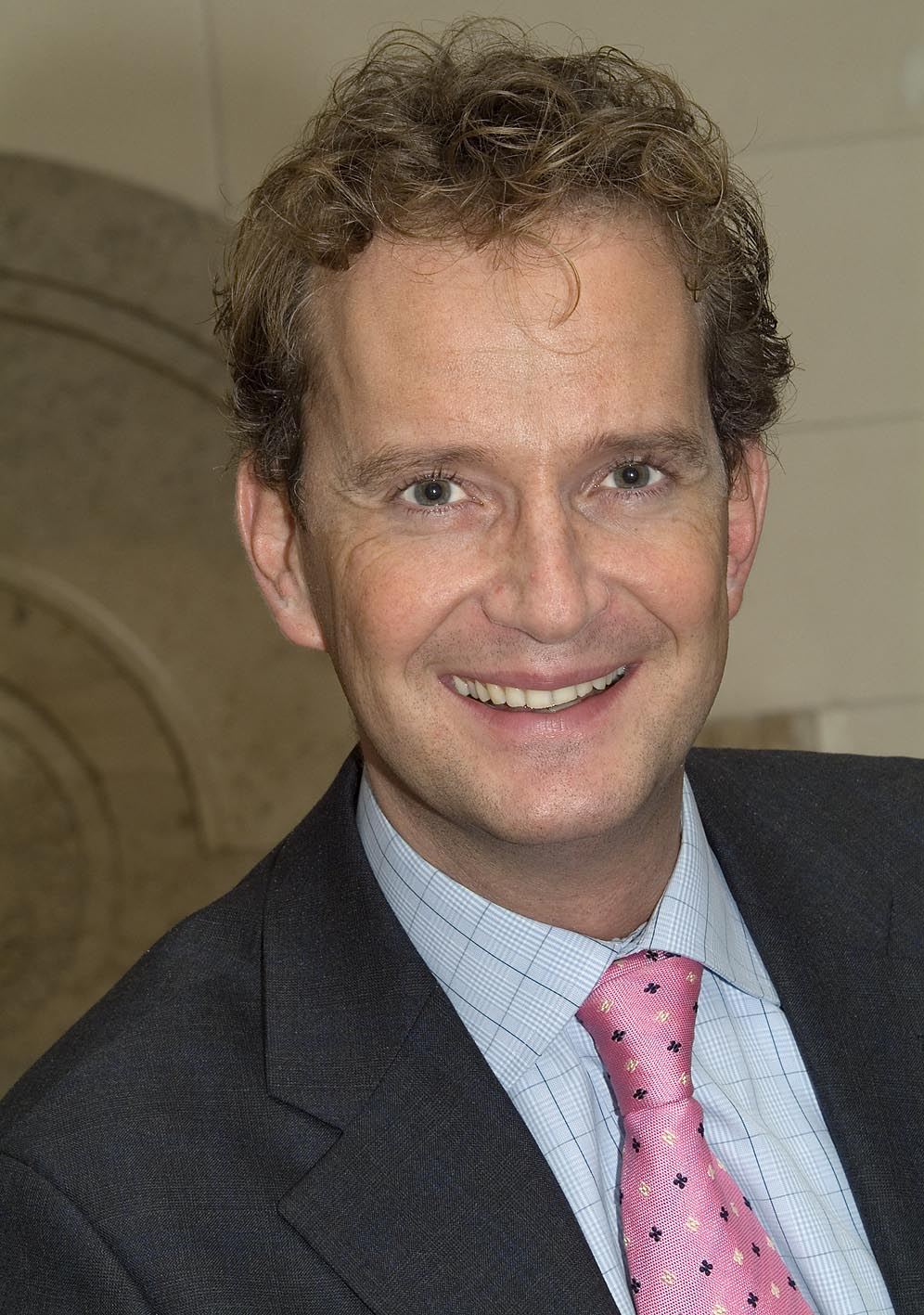
- Wijn in 2006

Minister of Economic Affairs
- In office 7 July 2006 – 22 February 2007
- Prime Minister: Jan Peter Balkenende
- Preceded by: Gerrit Zalm (ad interim)
- Succeeded by: Maria van der Hoeven

State Secretary for Finance
- In office 27 May 2003 – 7 July 2006
- Prime Minister: Jan Peter Balkenende
- Preceded by: Steven van Eijck
- Succeeded by: Jan Kees de Jager (2007)

State Secretary for Economic Affairs
- In office 22 July 2002 – 27 May 2003
- Prime Minister: Jan Peter Balkenende
- Preceded by: Gerrit Ybema
- Succeeded by: Karien van Gennip

Member of the House of Representatives
- In office 30 November 2006 – 22 February 2007
- In office 30 January 2003 – 27 May 2003
- In office 19 May 1998 – 22 July 2002

Personal details
- Born: Joannes Gerardus Wijn; 20 May 1969 (age 57) Haarlem, Netherlands
- Party: Christian Democratic Appeal (from 1986)
- Spouse: Patrick Mikkelsen (m. 2005)
- Education: University of Amsterdam (Bachelor of Economics, Bachelor of Laws, Master of Economics, Master of Laws)
- Occupation: Politician; economist; jurist; businessman; banker; financial adviser; financial analyst; corporate director; nonprofit director; trade association executive; teacher

Joannes Gerardus "Joop" Wijn (Dutch pronunciation: [joːp ˈʋɛin]; born 20 May 1969) is a Dutch businessman and former politician of the Christian Democratic Appeal (CDA) who served as Minister of Economic Affairs from 2006 to 2007 under Prime Minister Jan Peter Balkenende.

== Early life and education ==
Wijn attended a gymnasium in Haarlem from April 1981 until May 1987 and applied at the University of Amsterdam in June 1987 majoring in Economics and obtaining a Bachelor of Economics degree in June 1989 before graduating with a Master of Economics degree in July 1991 and applied subsequently for a postgraduate education in Law and obtaining a Bachelor of Laws degree in June 1992 before graduating with a Master of Laws degree in July 1994. He completed an internship with Shell/Billiton in Indonesia.

Wijn worked as a economics teacher at the Kennemer Lyceum in Overveen and Schoevers from August 1991 until July 1994. Wijn worked as an investment manager responsible for subordinated capital and equity investments in SMEs at the ABN AMRO from July 1994 until May 1998.

== Politics ==
Wijn was elected to the House of Representatives for the Christian Democratic Appeal in the 1998 general election, taking office on 19 May 1998. As an MP he served as spokesperson for finance, small business and integration, and as deputy spokesperson for economic affairs and postal services. In 2000, Joop Wijn voted in favor of opening civil marriage to same-sex couples, thereby supporting the legalization of same-sex marriage. In doing so, he went against his party's official position. Nevertheless, Wijn was later nominated by his party to become the first openly gay cabinet minister in the Netherlands.

After the 2002 general election, Wijn was appointed State Secretary for Economic Affairs responsible for foreign trade in the Balkenende I cabinet, taking office on 22 July 2002. The cabinet fell just four months later on 16 October 2002 after tensions in the coalition over the instability of the Pim Fortuyn List (LPF) and continued to serve in a demissionary capacity. In his capacity as Minister for Foreign Trade, Wijn led the first joint trade mission to India in November 2002, together with his colleague, State Secretary for Development Cooperation Agnes van Ardenne. According to Wijn, “a country's development can only be sustainable if the private sector plays an active role in it”.

After the 2003 general election, Wijn returned to the House of Representatives, taking office on 30 January 2003. Following the 2003 cabinet formation, Wijn was appointed as State Secretary for Finance in the Balkenende II cabinet, taking office on 27 May 2003. Among other things, Wijn was responsible for the functioning of the Tax and Customs Administration, which he transformed into an organisation that not only collects but also redistributes funds, e.g. for healthcare expenses, rent support and child benefits. His platform was the reduction of red tape and the promotion of tax benefits for families with children.

Wijn introduced reforms to modernize Dutch corporate tax law. He has improved the business and investment climate for companies. The general corporate income tax rate has been reduced from 34.5% to 25.5%. SMEs were granted a profit exemption of 10% and the dividend tax has been reduced from 25% to 15%. He also introduced the interest and patent box to facilitate R&D from a tax point of view (innovation box).

In 2004, Joop Wijn reached an agreement with U.S. Treasury Secretary John Snow to amend the tax treaty between the Netherlands and the United States. On the one hand, the withholding tax on dividends paid between parent companies and their subsidiaries was eliminated. In return, stricter requirements were imposed on qualifying companies. The parent company was required to own at least 80% of the subsidiary's shares, and the companies had to conduct genuine economic activities (meeting substance requirements and not merely functioning as "letterbox companies"). The agreement also expanded the exchange of information between the Dutch and U.S. tax authorities.. Since 1997, the U.S. Internal Revenue Service (IRS) has allowed companies to take advantage of differences between U.S. federal and Dutch tax law in the classification of legal entities and taxable income through the “check-the-box”rules. The 2004 protocol preserved these arrangements, with the approval the Dutch Parliament and the U.S. Senate. Beginning in 2020, the Netherlands implemented the rules of Council Directive (EU) 2017/952 on hybrid mismatches with third countries to address these arrangements. In 2025, the United States also introduced additional requirements. When a White House fact sheet in 2009 suggested that the Netherlands was a tax haven, Deputy Prime Minister and Minister of Finance Wouter Bos of the Labour Party (PvdA) called the claim "completely wrong." The White House subsequently confirmed that the Netherlands should not have been included on the list and stated that the fact sheet would be corrected. Academic research has confirmed that the Obama White House removed the Netherlands from the fact sheet the following day.

The Balkenende II cabinet fell on 30 June 2006 after the Democrats 66 (D66) had lost confidence in the functioning of Minister of Integration and Asylum Affairs Rita Verdonk and continued to serve in a demissionary capacity until the 2006–2007 cabinet formation, when it was replaced by the Balkenende III cabinet, with Wijn appointed as Minister of Economic Affairs, taking office on 7 July 2006. After the 2006 general election, Wijn again returned to the House of Representatives, taking office on 30 November 2006. On 6 February 2007, Wijn unexpectedly announced his retirement from national politics and per his own request asked not to be considered for a cabinet post in the new cabinet, the Balkenende III cabinet was replaced by the Balkende IV cabinet on 22 February 2007 and he resigned from the House of Representatives the same day.

== Business ==
Wijn left politics after the Balkenende IV cabinet was installed. He was asked earlier by the CDA party leadership to take on the parliamentary leadership of his party, but Wijn declined that position in August. Wijn retired from national politics and became active in the private sector, in June 2007 he was named as chief business officer (CBO) of the Rabobank, in 2009 Gerrit Zalm asked him to join ABN AMRO, which he did. In February 2009 Wijn was named as Head of Corporate Banking and member of the managing board of the ABN AMRO. In May 2017 Wijn was named as chief strategy officer (CSO) and chief risk officer (CRO) of Adyen. Wijn also became active in the public sector and occupied numerous seats as a nonprofit director on several boards of directors and supervisory boards (Orange Foundation, nl:Stadsherstel Amsterdam and the Jaarbeurs). Currently, Joop Wijn serves as Chairman of the Supervisory Board of insurance company a.s.r. and as a member of the Supervisory Boards of NIBC Bank and Euronext Amsterdam.

== Decorations ==
Honours
Ribbon bar	Honour	Country	Date	Comment
	Officer of the Order of Orange-Nassau	Netherlands	11 April 2007	

Political offices
Preceded by Gerrit Ybema	State Secretary for Economic Affairs; 2002–2003	Succeeded by Karien van Gennip
Preceded by Steven van Eijck	State Secretary for Finance; 2003–2006	Succeeded by Jan Kees de Jager
Preceded by Gerrit Zalm; Ad interim	Minister of Economic Affairs; 2006–2007	Succeeded by Maria van der Hoeven
Business positions
Unknown	Vice Chairman of the Board of directors of the Schiphol Group; 2012–present	Incumbent
Non-profit organization positions
Preceded by Hans Wijers	Chairman of the Supervisory board of the Orange Foundation; 2011–2017	Succeeded by Dick Benschop
