= 2003 Dutch cabinet formation =

After the general election of 22 January 2003, a cabinet formation took place in Netherlands. This resulted in the formation of the second Balkenende cabinet on 27 May 2003, comprising the Christian Democratic Appeal (CDA), People's Party for Freedom and Democracy (VVD) and Democrats 66 (D66).

== Informateur Donner ==
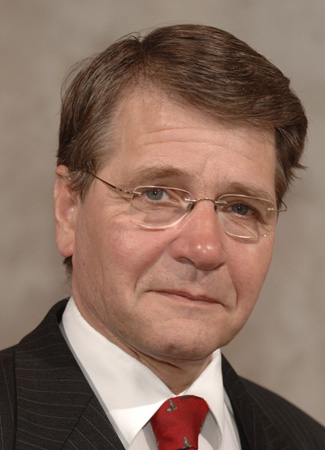
Informateur Piet Hein Donner (CDA), 2007

== Informateurs Donner and Leijnse ==
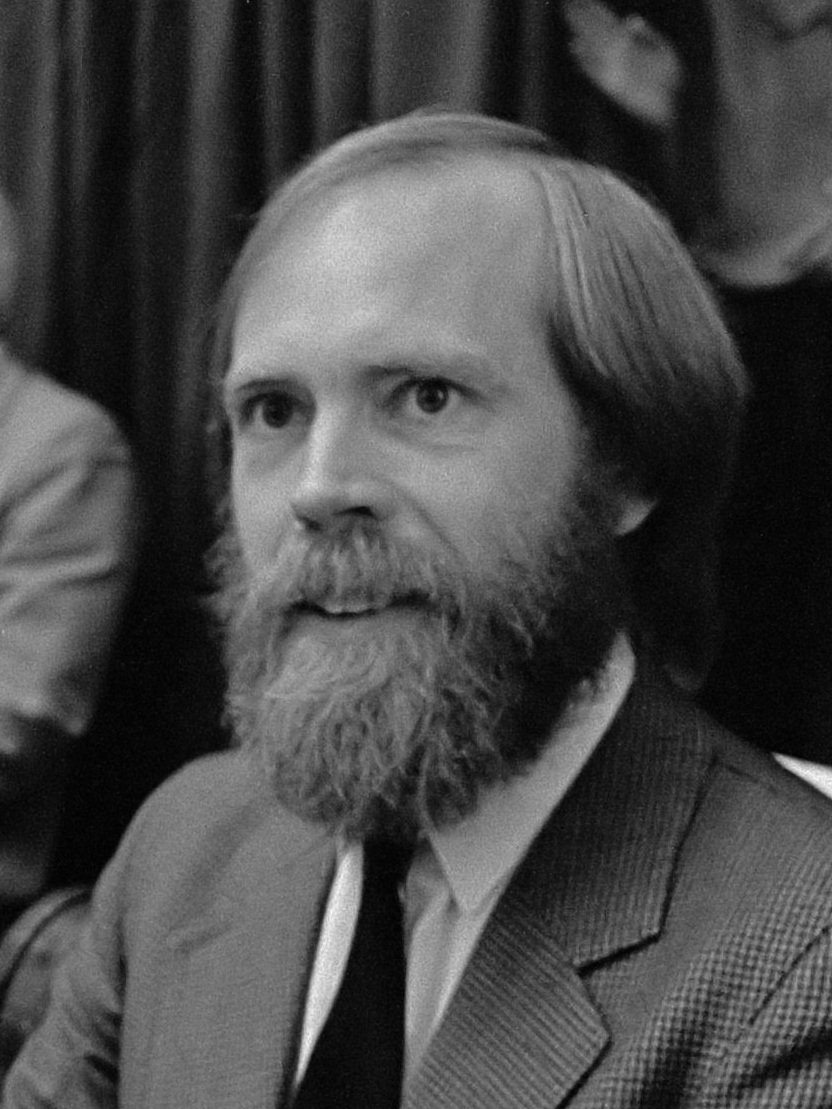
Informateur Frans Leijnse (PvdA), 1984

The first round of negotiations started on February 5 aimed at a CDA-PvdA coalition. There was large consensus in the House of Representatives and the general public that a cabinet based on these parties would properly reflect the outcome of the elections. The Queen Beatrix appointed Piet Hein Donner (CDA) and Frans Leijnse (PvdA) as informateurs. Jan Peter Balkenende negotiated with Maxime Verhagen and Joop Wijn on behalf of CDA, Wouter Bos, together with Ferd Crone and Jet Bussemaker on behalf of the PvdA.

This first information round stranded however on April 12 on what Balkenende called lack of chemistry. Concerning the last proposal of the CDA the informateurs in their report wrote: "given the nature of the measures which had been set out, we however saw (...) in this proposal no basis for any consultation that offered a view on a more satisfactory outcome with regard to the economic indicators and an expedient agreement".

According to CDA-party chairman Marja van Bijsterveldt, the PvdA added new requirements during the negotiations all the time: if you observe that after many weeks in the formation process you end up in a swamp of new plans and statistical macroeconomic calculations with unfavorable consequences for economic growth, the budget deficit and employment, then it is warranted to change course.

According to PvdA negotiator Wouter Bos it was actually the CDA that suddenly brushed aside all programs agreed upon and instead came up with entirely new proposals: We have spent two and a half month for nothing on talks and have been fooled. This is an enormous slap in the face and I also think a slap in the face of the advisers. I feel terribly cheated.

There was much dissatisfaction with the failed information attempt, since the process lasted rather long, without any results and also because in the meanwhile the country lacked a proper stable missionary cabinet. Moreover, the CDA-PvdA option was the only possible majority cabinet formed by just two parties.

== Informateur Hoekstra and Korthals Altes ==
On April 15 the queen appointed the political adviser Rein Jan Hoekstra (CDA) and minister of state Frits Korthals Altes (VVD) as new advisors with the task of investigating the possibilities of a majority cabinet existing of CDA and VVD and one or more other parties.

In the second information round the advisors examined three possible cabinets that included CDA and VVD:

- CDA, VVD and LPF, a continuation of the first Balkenende cabinet, which had fallen just months before;
- CDA, VVD, ChristenUnie and SGP, the so-called Staphorster variation, named after the SGP stronghold Staphorst;
- CDA, VVD and D66.

Given the demise of the First Balkenende cabinet, the LPF was not a viable candidate but both other options seemed feasible. On April 29 CDA and VVD opted for a coalition with the left-wing liberals of D66. The small Christian parties ChristianUnion and SGP were side-tracked particularly due to the ideological distance between the liberal VVD and the Orthodox Reformed SGP.

After the advisers had submitted their report, Queen Beatrix requested on May first that they should continue their research and focus themselves at filling in all practicalities and deepening of discussion and aim for a rapid program for a cabinet of CDA, VVD and d66.

From then on the negotiations proceeded successfully. On May 15 the negotiators announced they were close to a common programme of policy. On May 16 the parliamentary parties of CDA, VVD and D66 agreed on this coalition agreement. In addition, D66 put the question of participation in this new cabinet up for approval by their party congress which was held on May 18.

== Formateur Balkenende ==
After a parliamentary debate concerning the information and the coalition agreement on May 20, the informateurs did report to queen Beatrix and the same evening Jan Peter Balkenende was appointed as Formateur. Maxime Verhagen was appointed as leader of the CDA parliamentary party and together with Gerrit Zalm (VVD) and Boris Dittrich (D66) he started new negotiations on the formation of a new cabinet.

Within a week all ministers and state secretaries for the new cabinet had been identified. Because the previous cabinet with two of the three prospective coalition partners already in it had been installed only a year ago, 17 members of the new cabinet held their post and only 9 new members had to be appointed.

One flaw of the First Balkenende cabinet was corrected with the installation of the second: it contained more female members. On May 27, 2003, the Second Balkenende cabinet was sworn in the queen.

== Aftermath ==
The Second Balkenende cabinet fell prematurely on June 30, 2006, after the D66 bailed out over objections to Rita Verdonk's handling of the Ayaan Hirsi Ali citizenship controversy.
