= Traineeship scheme of the European Commission =

EU Commission Blue Book Traineeship

The official traineeship scheme of the European Commission, also known as the Blue Book Traineeship, is a traineeship programme providing official in-service training with the European Commission. Aimed at young university graduates, it has been running since 1960 and is the biggest traineeship programme in the world. Traineeships, which start in October or March and last five months, are carried out in a Directorate-General or a service of the Commission, in a Commissioner's Cabinet, or in some of European Union's executive bodies and agencies. The programme is managed by a dedicated Traineeships Office within DG EAC, with an annual budget of €7 million, that runs a selection procedure to recruit approximately 600 trainees (also called Blue book stagiaires) for each traineeship period.

== Selection procedure ==
Administrative traineeships (i.e. all traineeships except those with Directorate-General for Translation) consist of the following steps:

- Application (deadline at end of January/August)
- Eligibility (decision made before end of April/October)
- Preselection (decision made in June/November)
- Selection (decision made in July/January)
- Traineeship (start in October/March)

Applicants who advance into the Selection phase are listed in a database called the (Virtual) Blue Book from which European Commission officers entitled to having a trainee are free to choose their candidates. On contacting them, the details of the traineeship are agreed upon. Approximately 2,500 candidates get into the Blue Book for every traineeship period, of whom around 650 are recruited as trainees.

As an exception, Directorate-General for Translation applies its own eligibility criteria to what are called translation traineeships, and there is no preselection. The rest of the procedure, however, is the same as for administrative traineeship.

== Working conditions ==
Each trainee is assigned to an adviser who acts as a mentor. Trainees work full-time, according to same rules as European Civil Servants (although unlike them, they are considered "external staff") and are paid a monthly living allowance equal to 25% of the basic remuneration for an official at grade AD 5/1. Their travel costs to the place of appointment and back home are reimbursed during the last month of the traineeship. It is up to the trainee to find accommodation near the place of appointment. Most trainees are based in Brussels, with further large groups located in Luxembourg and Strasbourg. Every member states hosts at least one agency, body, institution or diplomatic mission of the European Union where a smaller number or trainees carryout their traineeships.

== Statistics ==
Starting with 3 trainees in 1960, by 1983 their number had reached 500, and in 2010 about 1,200 trainees were recruited (the two traineeship periods counted together). During the first 50 years of its history (1960–2010), more than 40,000 trainees have participated in the programme. The highest number of trainees has come from Italy (almost 4,500), the lowest number from Malta (around 50). Almost 3,500 trainees came from non-EU countries. Approximately 70% of trainees are female.

Number of admissions, number of selected applicants, and rate of selection to Blue Book Internship by country for October 2024 cycle.

The average trainee (in 2009) was 26 years old, spoke four languages and had two university diplomas. The October 2011 traineeship has seen a total of 10,424 applicants, out of which 9,349 were nationals of EU member states. From them, 652 were recruited as trainees. Most trainees come from Italy (73), and 44 recruits are non-EU citizens. Compared to this, two years later, in October 2013, the number of applicants had increased to a total of 14,028, with an average success rate of just under 5%. October 2015 has been the most competitive session yet, with 24,690 applicants.

For the period between 2016 and 2020, 111,964 applications for trainee positions in the Administration sector were received. Of these, 6,486 were successful, a rate of 5.79%. For the Translation sector the success rate was 4.76% (515 out of 10,824 applications).

== List of notable trainees ==
Many ex-trainees have gone on to become people of note, such as:

- Dacian Cioloş, European Commissioner and former Prime-Minister of Romania
- King Felipe VI of Spain
- Michael Froman, U.S. presidential assistant and deputy national security adviser
- Prince Hassan of Jordan
- Silvana Koch-Mehrin, former German Member of the European Parliament
- Lousewies van der Laan, former Dutch Member of the European Parliament
- Prince Laurent of Belgium
- Manuel Marín, former European Commissioner
- King Mohammed VI of Morocco
- Mario Monti, former European Commissioner, Prime Minister of Italy
- Christine Ockrent, Belgian journalist and TV presenter
- Odile Quintin, former Director General of European Commission's Directorate-General for Education and Culture
- Viviane Reding, European Commissioner
- Beppe Severgnini, Italian columnist
- Daniel Varela Suanzes-Carpegna, Spanish politician
