= Daniel Varela Suanzes-Carpegna =

Spanish politician

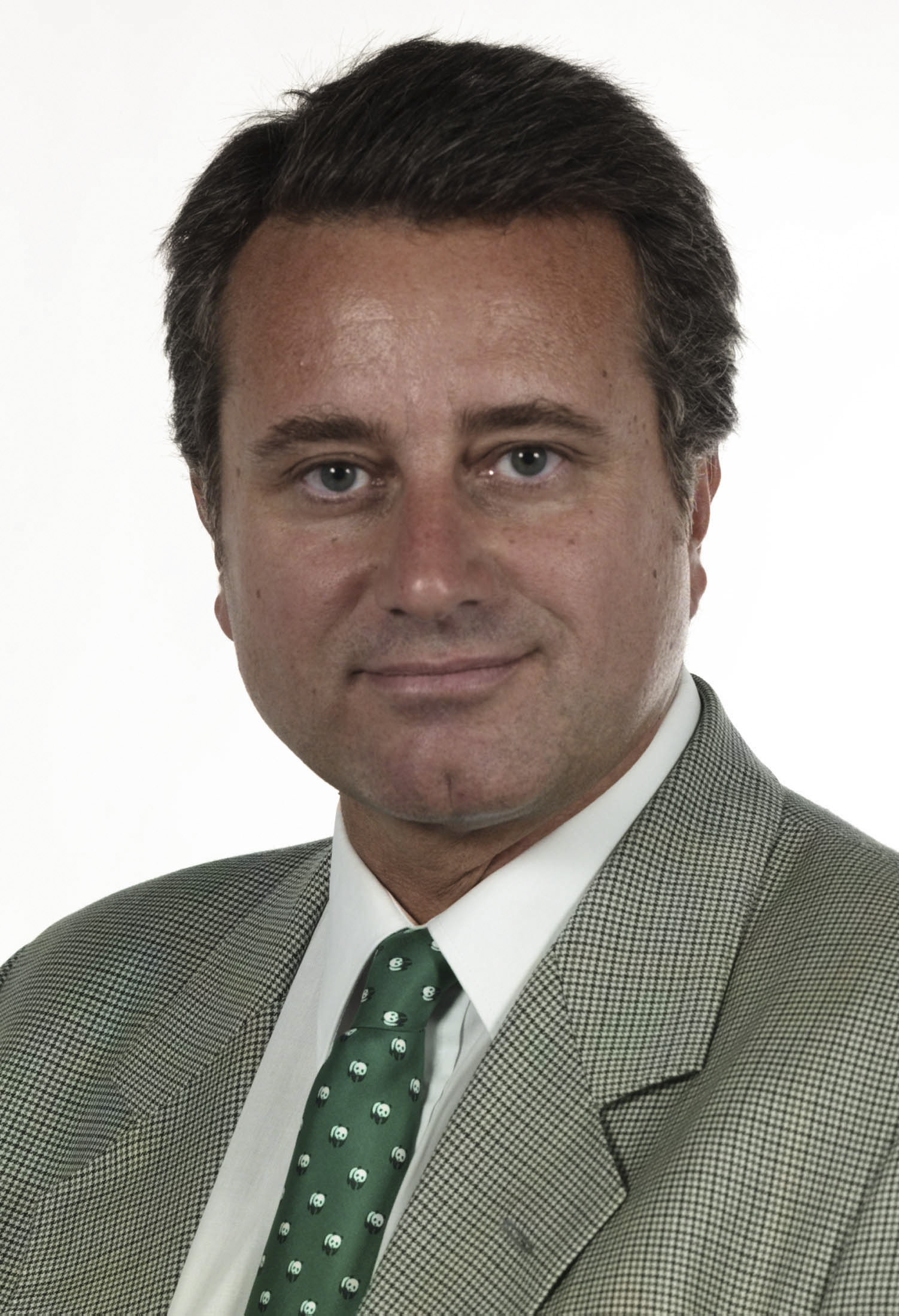
Suanzes-Carpegna in 1999

Daniel Varela Suanzes-Carpegna (born 1 April 1951 in Lugo) is a Spanish politician and former Member of the European Parliament with the People's Party, part of the European People's Party. He served in the European Parliament from 1994 to 2009.

During his last mandate, he was vice-chair of European Parliament's Committee on International Trade and of its Committee on Fisheries. He was also a substitute for the Committee on Regional Development and a member of the Delegation for relations with Australia and New Zealand.

== Education ==
- 1974: Graduate in law
- diploma in international studies
- 1980: Diplomatic School
- 1985: diploma in European Community studies
- 1985: Traineeship in the Legal Service of the European Commission

== Career ==
- 1985–1993: Legal adviser to the Galician regional government
- 1990–1992: Commissioner for Galicia at Expo-92
- 1994–2009: Member of the European Parliament
- 1999–2002: Chairman of the Committee on Fisheries
- 2002–2004: Coordinator on fisheries for the EPP Group
- 2002–2004: Coordinator on safety at sea for the EPP Group
- First Vice-Chairman of the Committee on International Trade

== See also ==
- 2004 European Parliament election in Spain
