= Lousewies van der Laan =

Dutch politician (born 1966)

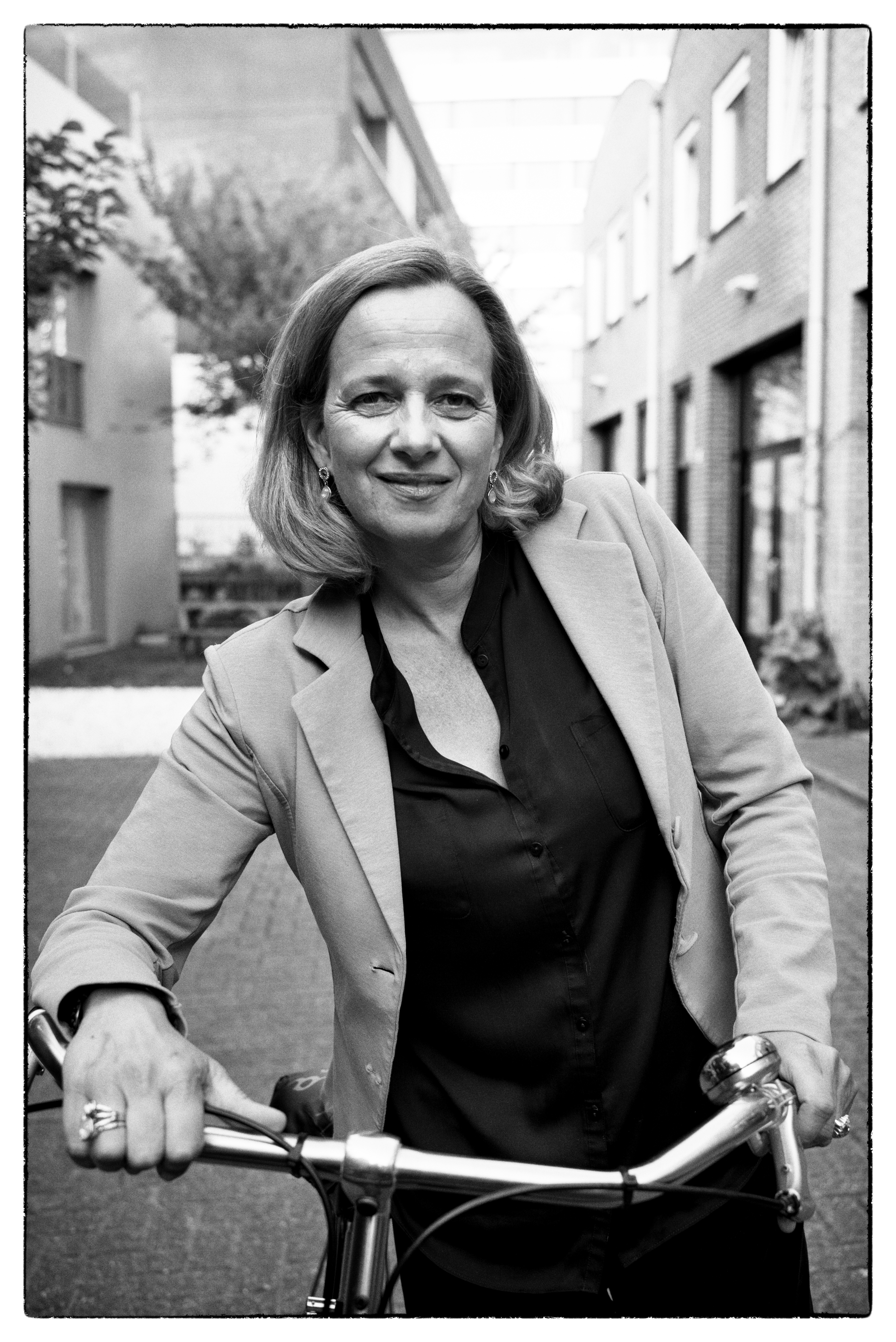
- Lousewies van der Laan in 2016

Parliamentary leader in the House of Representatives
- In office 3 February 2006 – 30 November 2006
- Preceded by: Boris Dittrich
- Succeeded by: Alexander Pechtold
- Parliamentary group: Democrats 66

Member of the House of Representatives
- In office 30 January 2003 – 30 November 2006
- Parliamentary group: Democrats 66

Member of the European Parliament
- In office 20 July 1999 – 30 January 2003
- Parliamentary group: European Liberal Democrat and Reform Party Group
- Constituency: Netherlands

Personal details
- Born: Louse Wies Sija Anne Lilly Berte van der Laan; 18 February 1966 (age 60) Rotterdam, Netherlands
- Party: Democrats 66
- Children: 2
- Education: Leiden University (Bachelor of Laws, Master of Laws); Johns Hopkins University (Bachelor of Social Science)
- Occupation: Politician; civil servant; jurist; political consultant; nonprofit director; lobbyist

Louse Wies Sija Anne Lilly Berthe "Lousewies" van der Laan (born 18 February 1966) is a retired Dutch politician of the Democrats 66 (D66) party and jurist.

== Life before politics ==
In her youth, Van der Laan lived in Belgium, Germany, and the United States.

She finished high school at the German School in Washington, DC. She obtained the International Baccalaureate at Armand Hammer United World College of the American West (In Montezuma, New Mexico). After graduating in 1984, Van der Laan moved to the Netherlands to study law at the University of Leiden. She specialized in International and European Law and graduated in 1990. Between 1990 and 1991 she studied international relations at the Paul H. Nitze School of Advanced International Studies at Johns Hopkins University at Bologna. After an internship at Greenpeace in Brussels, she became an intern at the cabinet of Dutch European Commissioner Frans Andriessen.

Between 1991 and 1994 she worked for TACIS of the European Commission, where she was responsible for environmental projects. In 1995 she worked as an environmental specialist for the EBRD in London. Between 1995 and 1997 she worked for the Cabinet of Dutch European Commissioner for External Relations, Hans van den Broek. In 1997 she became his spokesperson.

== Political life ==
In 1999 she became head of the D66 list for the European elections. She became chairwoman of the parliamentary party and member of the parliamentary party board of the ELDR. In the European Parliament she was active on a range of issue focusing on civil liberties, environmental affairs, budget and international relations. In the European Parliament she was vice-chairwoman of the Committee on Budget Control between 1999 and 2002, vice-chairwoman of the Committee on Civil Liberties, Justice and Home Affairs between 2002 and 2003. She was member of the Committee on Women's Rights and Equal Opportunities between 1999 and 2003, the Delegation for relations with the Palestinian Legislative Council between 1999 and 2002. Between 1999 and 2002 she was a substitute for the Committee on Environmental Protection, Public Health and Consumers' Policy and a substitute for the Delegation for relations with Slovakia. Between 2002 and 2003 she was a substitute for the Budget Committee. She founded the Intergroup on Food Safety, the Campaign for Parliamentary Reform.

In 2003 she switched to the Dutch Parliament. She was the spokeswoman of her party on foreign policy, higher education, justice, technology, European affairs and gay rights. She was the vice-chairwoman of the parliamentary party and the chairwoman of the parliamentary committee on technology policy and vice-chairwoman of the committee on European affairs. In 2004, she and her husband, Dennis Hesseling, a mathematician, had a son that they named "Helix". Van der Laan, who speaks English and Dutch fluently, is raising her son bilingually.

She assumed the parliamentary leadership of D66 in the House of Representatives on 3 February 2006, succeeding Boris Dittrich. Dittrich stepped down after the debate on sending Dutch troops to the Afghan province of Uruzgan.

Lousewies van der Laan lost out to Alexander Pechtold in the June 2006 D66 leadership election.

Van der Laan played a significant role in the downfall of the Second Balkenende cabinet by supporting a motion of no confidence against Minister Rita Verdonk regarding Verdonk's behavior in the matter of Ayaan Hirsi Ali's citizenship. On 4 August 2006, she announced that she would retire from the House of Representatives after the 2006 elections. She describes herself as an agnostic.

== Life after politics ==
After leaving elected office, Lousewies van der Laan ran an international consultancy business, LW International, which included clients like the United Nations International Strategy for Disaster reduction. From January 2009 until 2015 she was employed as the Chef de Cabinet working for the Presidency of the International Criminal Court in The Hague.

Lousewies van der Laan remains active in promoting democracy, inter alia, by working with the National Democratic Institute, including as election observer at the 2007 elections in Morocco and 2009 elections in Lebanon. Since 2008 she has chaired the Dutch National Committee of United World Colleges, which selects students to attend one of the 12 United World Colleges around the world. She is a member of Women on Top, which advocates for more women in high level positions and works against the feminisation of poverty. She sits on various Advisory boards, including the Getu Foundation, the Rainbow Tree Foundation (Stichting De Regenboogboom) and the International Democratic Initiative. She has been a member of the Steering Board of the "Apeldoorn Conference", the bilateral conference between the UK and The Netherlands since 2004. She is a guest lecturer at the University of Maastricht, the Clingendael Institute for International Relations and the Nyenrode Business University.

In 2015 she was appointed to the Board of Directors of ICANN, for a three-year term starting in October 2015. She later served as director of the Dutch branch of Transparency International.

Party political offices
Preceded by Boris Dittrich	Parliamentary leader of the Democrats 66 in the House of Representatives; 2006	Succeeded by Alexander Pechtold
