= 2006 Democrats 66 leadership election =

- 24 June 2006
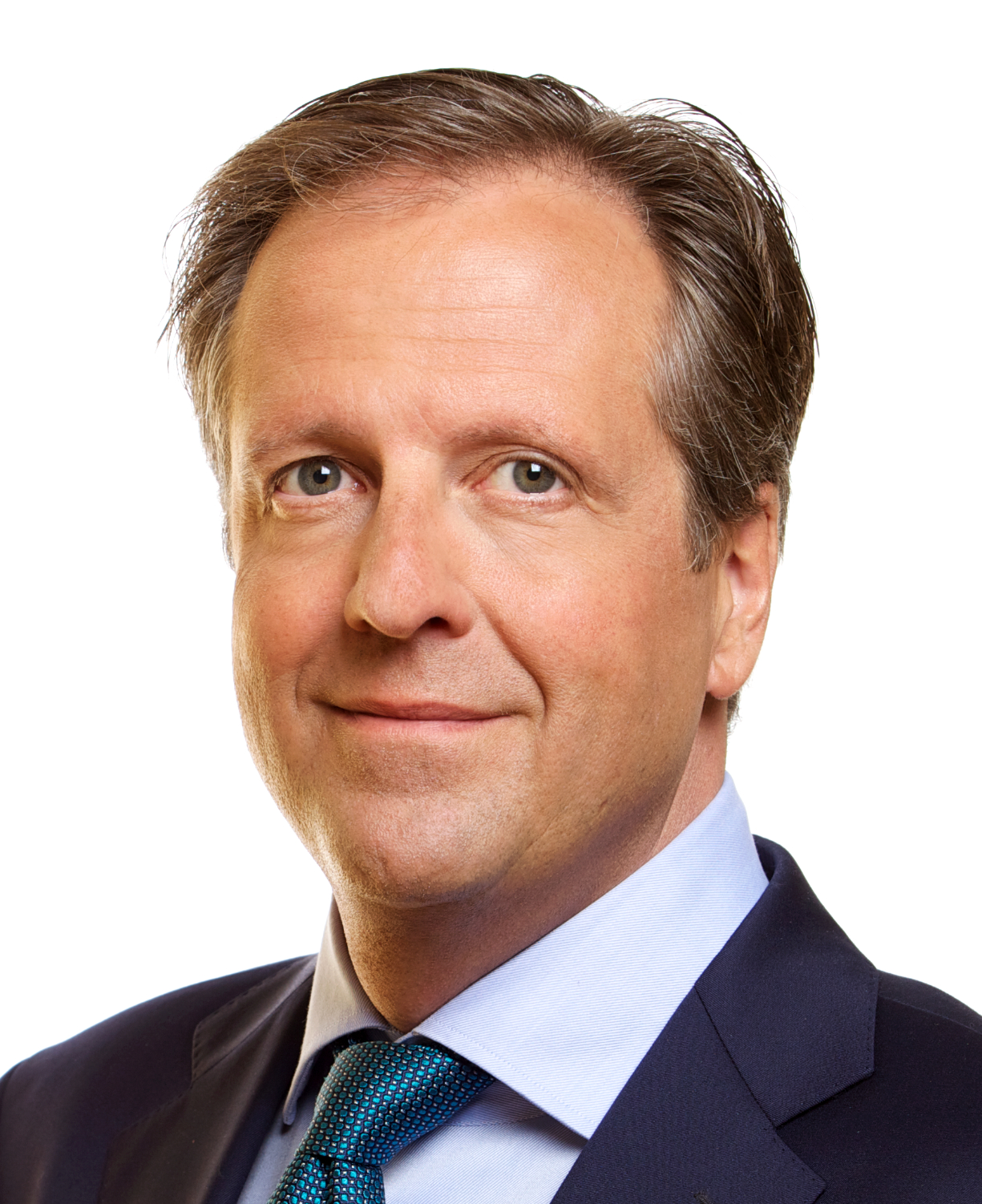

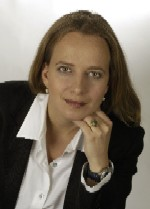
Candidate	Alexander Pechtold	Lousewies van der Laan
Popular vote	2,009	1,752
Percentage	52.6%	45.8%
Leader before election
Vacant
Leader-elect
Alexander Pechtold

In 2006, a leadership election was held for the leader of the Democrats 66 after incumbent Boris Dittrich announced his retirement from national politics. Dittrich, who had been the leader of the party since the resignation of Thom de Graaf on 22 January 2003, did not stand for the leadership election. Alexander Pechtold won the election, beating Lousewies van der Laan and six others.

== Background ==
The lijsttrekker election had been advanced to an earlier date under pressure of the party's largest regional sections. Boris Dittrich, parliamentary leader of D66 until February 2006, stepped down. He came under heavy criticism after the political debate on sending Dutch troops to Uruzgan. He was criticized for making tactical errors to get political support for the mission, which D66 itself opposed. He was succeeded by Van der Laan. Advancing the date of the lijsttrekker election would allow D66 more time to find its ideological course before the next national election.

== Candidates ==
- Alexander Pechtold, Minister for Governmental Reform and Kingdom Relations. He had been the chairperson of D66 between 2002 and 2005. He campaigned as an anti-establishment candidate, criticizing the "dirty and filthy" politics of The Hague. Van der Laan made several personal attacks against him because he wanted to re-think the Uruzgan mission, which had led to the resignation of Dittrich. Pechtold, however, received support from prominent party members, such as founder Hans van Mierlo, who believed that Van der Laan was "partly responsible for the current crisis in the party".
- Lousewies van der Laan, parliamentary leader in the House of Representatives. She had been a member of the European Parliament between 1999 and 2003, when she entered the House of Representatives. Her campaign was oriented towards the grassroots of the party. During the campaign she made two clear statements: freedom of education is bad for the integration of migrants and the other candidate, Pechtold, has lost his integrity. She received criticism for her personal attacks against Pechtold.

The other candidates were:

- Ricardo Gomila Vergara
- Simone Kuiter
- Carlo Strijk
- André van Wanrooij (had also been a candidate in the 2003 leadership election)
- Hein Westerouen van Meeteren
- Jan Zelle

== Procedure ==
A congress was held in The Hague on 24 June 2006. Eligible D66 members could vote for a candidate in two ways, either they filled in the mail-in ballot they received on 8 June before 23 June, or they made their choice clear on the day of the congress. Only D66 members who had paid their membership dues before 29 May 2006 could vote.

== Results ==
Five counting rounds were necessary to elect the lijsttrekker. Alexander Pechtold was voted the new lijsttrekker. In the final round he received 2,009 of the 3,823 votes, 52.6% of the total in the sixth count of the election. The runner-up was Lousewies van der Laan, obtaining 1,752 votes, 45.8% of the total. 62 votes were declared invalid. In the first round Pechtold obtained 1,860 out of 3,905 votes (47.6%), Lousewies van der Laan 1,662 votes (42.6%) and Hein van Meeteren 182 votes (4.7%).

=== Results ===
Name	Round 1	Round 2	Round 3	Round 4	Round 5	Round 6
Alexander Pechtold	1,860	1,862	1,865	1,877	1,895	2,009
Lousewies van der Laan	1,662	1,663	1,664	1,673	1,692	1,752
Hein Westerouen van Meeteren	189	189	190	199	221	eliminated
Carlo Strijk	64	64	68	75	eliminated	
Simone Kuiter	44	47	50	eliminated		
Jan Zelle	14	16	eliminated			
Ricardo Gomila Vergara	10	eliminated				
André van Wanrooij	withdrew					
Blank	62	62	62	62	62	62
Total votes cast	3905	3903	3899	3886	3870	3823
