= Alexander Pechtold =

Mayor of Delft (born 1965)

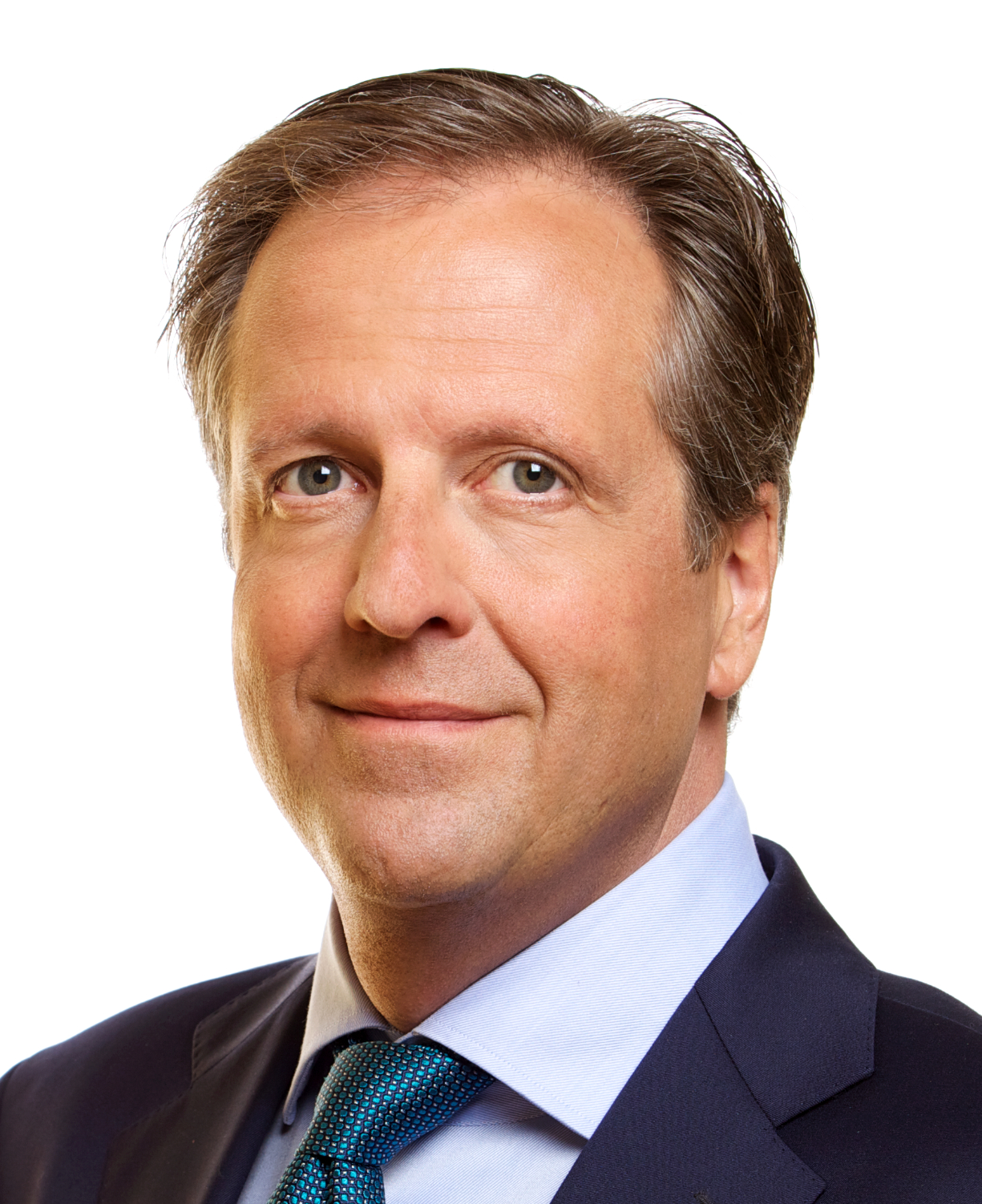
- Pechtold in 2013

Mayor of Delft
- Incumbent
- Assumed office 4 September 2025
- Preceded by: Marja van Bijsterveldt

Leader of the Democrats 66 in the House of Representatives
- In office 30 November 2006 – 10 October 2018
- Preceded by: Lousewies van der Laan
- Succeeded by: Rob Jetten

Member of the House of Representatives
- In office 30 November 2006 – 10 October 2018

Leader of the Democrats 66
- In office 24 June 2006 – 6 October 2018
- Preceded by: Boris Dittrich
- Succeeded by: Sigrid Kaag (2020)

Minister for the Interior
- In office 31 March 2005 – 3 July 2006
- Prime Minister: Jan Peter Balkenende
- Preceded by: Thom de Graaf
- Succeeded by: Atzo Nicolaï

Mayor of Wageningen
- In office 1 October 2003 – 31 March 2005
- Preceded by: Geke Faber
- Succeeded by: Chris Rutten (ad Interim)

Chair of the Democrats 66
- In office 16 November 2002 – 31 March 2005
- Leader: Thom de Graaf (2002–2003); Boris Dittrich (2003–2005)
- Preceded by: Gerard Schouw
- Succeeded by: Jan Hoekema (ad Interim)

Personal details
- Born: Alexander Pechtold; 16 December 1965 (age 60) Delft, Netherlands
- Party: Democrats 66 (since 1989)
- Spouse: Froukje Idema (m. 1997; div. 2018)
- Children: One son, one daughter
- Education: Leiden University (BA, MA)
- Occupation: Politician · Civil servant · Auctioneer · Art historian

Alexander Pechtold (born 16 December 1965) is a Dutch politician and art historian. He is a member of Democrats 66.

Pechtold studied Archaeology and History of Dutch Art at Leiden University, and obtained a Master of Arts degree. Pechtold worked as an auctioneer in The Hague from July 1992 until June 1996 and as an Alderman in Leiden from June 1996 until October 2003. Pechtold served as Chairman of the Democrats 66 from 16 November 2002 until 31 March 2005. In September 2003, Pechtold was nominated as the next mayor of Wageningen taking office on 1 October 2003. Pechtold was appointed as Minister without Portfolio for the Interior in the second Balkenende cabinet following a cabinet reshuffle, taking office on 31 March 2005. After Party Leader Boris Dittrich announced he was stepping down, Pechtold announced his candidacy and was elected as his successor on 24 June 2006. The cabinet fell just a year later, and he resigned on 3 July 2006.

For the 2006 general election, Pechtold served as lead candidate and was elected to the House of Representatives, becoming Parliamentary leader on 30 November 2006. For the 2010, 2012 and 2017 general elections, Pechtold served as lead candidate again, and following a successful cabinet formation in 2017 with the People's Party for Freedom and Democracy (VVD), the Christian Democratic Appeal (CDA) and the Christian Union formed the third Rutte cabinet, with Pechtold opting to remain as Parliamentary leader. In October 2018 Pechtold unexpectedly announced his retirement from national politics and stepped down as leader and Parliamentary leader on 10 October 2018.

== Early life ==
Alexander Pechtold was born on 16 December 1965 in Delft in the Dutch province of South Holland. Pechtold and his elder brother Roland Pechtold grew up in the village of Rhoon. He went to a Lyceum in Rotterdam. Pechtold studied art history and archaeology with a specialization in 17th-century painting at Leiden University, obtaining a Bachelor of Arts and a Master of Arts degree in 1996. During that time Pechtold obtained certification as an auctioneer, and worked for the Van Stockum's Veilingen during his studies.

== Politics ==
=== Party chair ===
Pechtold became a member of the Democrats 66 (D66) party in 1989. He was elected as a Municipal councillor in Leiden in 1994, and became an alderman in 1996. On 16 November 2002 he was elected as Chairman of the D66. Pechtold was tasked with reforming the party after its disastrous results in the 2002 general election, and preparing for the upcoming 2003 general election.

=== Mayor of Wageningen ===
On 1 October 2003, Pechtold was appointed mayor of Wageningen; he remained chairman of the D66.

=== Minister for Government Reform and Kingdom Relations ===
Thom de Graaf, the D66 Deputy Prime Minister and Minister for Government Reform and Kingdom Relations in the Second Balkenende cabinet, resigned on 23 March 2005 after the introduction of democratically elected mayors had been rejected in the Senate. The proposal was especially important; it had become a symbol of the government reform that the D66 had wanted since the party's creation. Pechtold was asked to succeed him as Minister. Pechtold resigned as chairman and mayor the same day that he took office as the new Minister for Government Reform and Kingdom Relations, on 31 March 2005.

On 29 June 2006 the D66 retracted its support for the Second Balkenende cabinet. The next day, Prime Minister Jan Peter Balkenende offered the resignation of the full cabinet to Queen Beatrix. Pechtold resigned as Minister for Government Reform and Kingdom Relations on 3 July 2006. His fellow D66 cabinet member Laurens Jan Brinkhorst, the Deputy Prime Minister and Minister of Economic Affairs, resigned on 7 July 2006.

=== House of Representatives ===
Pechtold was elected the Leader of the D66 on 24 June 2006 in the leadership election of 2006, defeating Lousewies van der Laan, the party's Parliamentary leader in the House of Representatives. Van der Laan had only a few months earlier succeeded Boris Dittrich, who had resigned as party leader and parliamentary leader in the House of Representatives on 3 February 2006.

In 2007 the parliamentarian press chose Pechtold with 31% of the votes as the "Dutch politician of the year 2007".

For the 2006 general election Pechtold became lead candidate and the Democrats 66 lost three seats and became an opposition party. For the 2010 general election, Pechtold again as lead candidate won ten seats but the Democrats 66 remained an opposition party. With the following 2012 general election, Pechtold again as lead candidate won two seats with the Democrats 66 again remaining an opposition party.

During the fourth Balkenende cabinet administration Pechtold served as government opposition leader. After the 2010 general election, the D66 won seven seats in the House of Representatives which journalists claimed was due to Pechtold's leadership during the fourth Balkenende cabinet time. After the 2010 Dutch cabinet formation, D66 again remained in opposition. In 2012, Pechtold published Henk, Ingrid, & Alexander, which ostensibly aimed to break through the populism that had dominated Dutch politics in the previous decade, "Henk" and "Ingrid" being the generic names proposed by Geert Wilders and other Party for Freedom politicians to represent the average Dutch couple, by engaging everyday people in conversation. The book was panned in de Volkskrant as a "cheap PR-stunt without any value to it."

During a debate with Mark Rutte in 2010, Pechtold championed the cause of social liberalism, noting that the government "needs to offer services where fairness is more important than efficiency, such as education and healthcare," while accusing Rutte of pursuing policies that hurt the most vulnerable in Dutch society.

After the shootdown of Malaysia Airlines Flight 17 in July 2014, Pechtold explicitly voiced his support for economic expediency over ethical correctness by stating: "We are a small country, dependent on our exports, and unlike the United States, we cannot always react from our moral high grounds."

In December 2017, it was revealed that Pechtold received an apartment valued at 135,000 euros from Serge Marcoux, a former Canadian ambassador, that was not listed on the gift register of the House of Representatives, with Pechtold justifying the lack of report by saying that he knew Marcoux from outside politics and that the apartment was a private gift which did not fall under the purview of the register.

On 6 October 2018, Pechtold announced his resignation as D66 leader and from the parliament. As chairman of the parliamentary party, Pechtold was succeeded by Rob Jetten on 9 October.

== Post-politics ==
Pechtold retired from active politics at 52 and became active in the public sector as a non-profit director and serves on several state commissions and councils on behalf of the government. In October 2019 Pechtold was appointed as Director-General of the Central Bureau of Driving Licenses (CBR). From 23 March 2021, Pechtold presents the TV program De Achterkant van het Gelijk for broadcaster BNNVARA on NPO 2. Since 22 April 2021, Pechtold has been the chairman of the Supervisory Board of the Dutch Lottery. On 5 June 2025, Pechtold was nominated as mayor of his hometown of Delft.

== Personal life ==
Pechtold is divorced and has two children.

== Electoral history ==
Electoral history of Alexander Pechtold
Year	Body	Party	Pos.	Votes	Result		Ref.
Year	Body	Party	Pos.	Votes	Party seats	Individual	Ref.
2006	House of Representatives	Democrats 66	1	95,937	3	Won	
2010	House of Representatives	Democrats 66	1	507,187	10	Won	
2012	House of Representatives	Democrats 66	1	586,454	12	Won	
2017	House of Representatives	Democrats 66	1	863,887	19	Won	
2023	House of Representatives	Democrats 66	78 (Note: Pecthold participated as a lijstduwer.)	1,196	9	Lost	

== Notes ==
Party political offices
Preceded by Gerard Schouw	Chair of the Democrats 66; 2002–2005	Succeeded by Jan Hoekema; Ad interim
Preceded by Boris Dittrich	Leader of the Democrats 66; 2006–2018	Succeeded by Sigrid Kaag
Preceded by Thom de Graaf; 2003	Lead candidate of the Democrats 66; 2006, 2010, 2012, 2017	Succeeded by Sigrid Kaag; 2021
Preceded by Lousewies van der Laan	Parliamentary leader of the Democrats 66 in the House of Representatives; 2006–2018	Succeeded by Rob Jetten
Political offices
Preceded by Geke Faber	Mayor of Wageningen; 2003–2005	Succeeded by Chris Rutten; Ad interim
Preceded by Thom de Graaf	Minister for the Interior; 2005–2006	Succeeded by Atzo Nicolaï
Civic offices
Preceded by Petra Delsing	Director-General of the Centraal Bureau Rijvaardigheidsbewijzen; 2019–present	Incumbent
