= Action Now! =

- Country: Netherlands
- Broadcast area: Netherlands; Flanders

Programming
- Language(s): Dutch
- Picture format: 576i 16:9 SDTV

Ownership
- Owner: TV4U B.V.

History
- Launched: 16 June 2006; 18 years ago
- Closed: 31 May 2009; 15 years ago

Links
- Website: actionnow.tv

Action Now! was a Dutch pay television movie channel, broadcasting in the Netherlands and Flanders. The programming of the channel mainly consisted of action movies. In November 2008 Dutch largest cable company Ziggo removed Action Now! from its network, followed by Caiway on 1 April 2009. The availability of Action Now! dropped considerably in the Netherlands, resulting in the closure of the channel on 31 May 2009.
