= Second Balkenende cabinet =

Cabinet of the Netherlands, 2003 to 2006

- Cabinet of the Netherlands

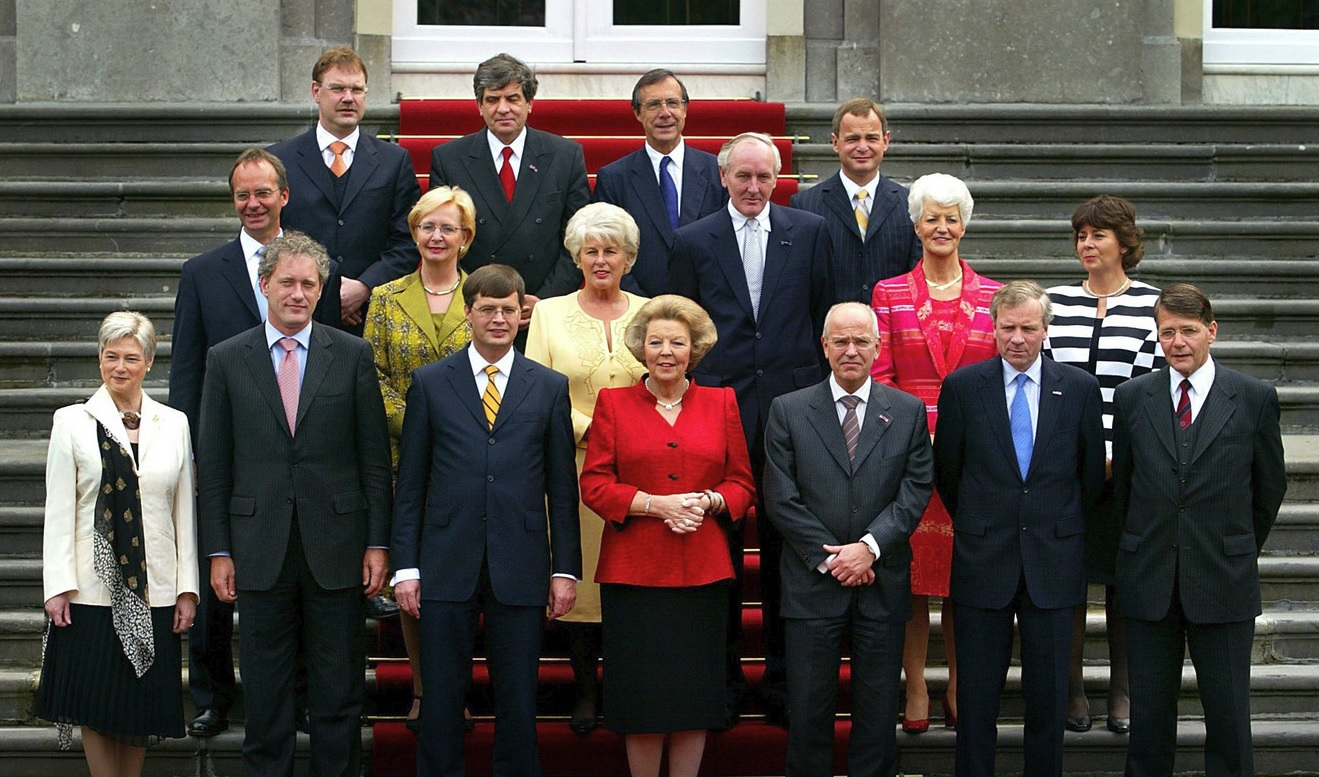
- The installation of the second Balkenende cabinet on 27 May 2003
- Date formed: 27 May 2003
- Date dissolved: 7 July 2006 (Demissionary from 30 June 2006)

People and organisations
- Head of state: Queen Beatrix
- Head of government: Jan Peter Balkenende
- Deputy head of government: Gerrit Zalm; Thom de Graaf (2003–2005); Laurens Jan Brinkhorst (2005–2006)
- No. of ministers: 16
- Ministers removed: 4
- Total no. of members: 18
- Member party: Christian Democratic Appeal (CDA); People's Party for Freedom and Democracy (VVD); Democrats 66 (D66)
- Status in legislature: Centre-right majority government

History
- Incoming formation: 2003 formation
- Outgoing formation: 2006–2007 formation
- Election: 2003 election
- Outgoing election: 2006 election
- Legislature terms: 2003–2007
- Predecessor: First Balkenende cabinet
- Successor: Third Balkenende cabinet

The second Balkenende cabinet was the executive branch of the Government of the Netherlands from 27 May 2003 until 7 July 2006. The cabinet was formed by the Christian-democratic Christian Democratic Appeal (CDA), the conservative-liberal People's Party for Freedom and Democracy (VVD), and the social-liberal Democrats 66 (D66) after the election of 2003. The cabinet was a centre-right coalition and had a slim majority in the House of Representatives with Christian Democratic Leader Jan Peter Balkenende serving as Prime Minister. Liberal Leader Gerrit Zalm, a former Minister of Finance, served as Deputy Prime Minister and returned as Minister of Finance, while former Progressive-Liberal Leader Thom de Graaf served as Deputy Prime Minister and Minister without Portfolio for the Interior.

The cabinet served during the unstable 2000s. Domestically, immigration was a major point of attention and it had to deal with the murder of controversial filmmaker and critic Theo van Gogh, while internationally, it dealt with the war on terror and the government support for the Iraq War. The cabinet suffered several major internal and external conflicts including multiple cabinet resignations, such as that of Deputy Prime Minister De Graaf following the failed introduction of a new referendum system. The cabinet fell prematurely on 30 June 2006 after Democrats 66 supported a motion of no confidence against Immigration Minister Rita Verdonk and withdrew its support, with all Democrats 66 cabinet members resigning on 3 July 2006 and the cabinet continuing in a demissionary capacity until it was replaced by the caretaker third Balkenende cabinet on 7 July 2006.

== Formation ==
Composition of the cabinet in relation to the rest of the legislature

On 24 January 2003 Queen Beatrix asked Minister of Justice Piet Hein Donner (CDA) to lead the coalition negotiations. The negotiations for the coalition were lengthy. Initially the CDA preferred to continue its Centre-right coalition with the VVD, but they did not have sufficient seats in the House of Representatives to continue in government without the support of a third party. Another coalition with Pim Fortuyn List (LPF) would be likely to be unpopular with voters after the events of the First Balkenende cabinet, and the D66 was unwilling to join such a coalition. A government supported by the Christian right-wing Reformed Political Party (SGP) and the social conservative Christian Union (CU) was opposed by the VVD.

A long negotiation between CDA and the Labour Party (PvdA) followed. The CDA and PvdA had come out of the elections as equal partners. The negotiations were troubled by the invasion of Iraq, the bad economic forecasts and personal animosity between incumbent Prime Minister and Leader of the Christian Democratic Appeal Jan Peter Balkenende and Wouter Bos the Leader of the Labour Party. After a couple of months talks were called off by Balkenende. At this point, D66 decided to join the coalition after all. The cabinet was based on a very slim majority in the House of Representatives of 78 seats out of 150. When VVD Member of the House of Representatives Geert Wilders left his party on 2 September 2004 (continuing as an independent), the narrow majority of the cabinet slimmed down even further to 77 seats in the Member of the House of Representatives.

== Term ==
=== Policy ===
The cabinet program is based around the slogan: Mee doen, Meer Werk, Minder Regels (Participation, More Jobs, and Fewer Rules). The cabinet seeks to address the problems of integration of ethnic minorities (participation), the economic recession (more employment) and the lack of trust in government (Fewer Regulations).

=== Migration and Integration policy ===
The most controversial issue the cabinet addressed is the perceived lack of integration of ethnic minorities, especially immigrants from Morocco and Turkey. To solve this problem this cabinet has tried to reduce the influx of migrants, and to force migrants to take an integration course. The cabinet appointed Rita Verdonk (VVD) as a Minister without Portfolio within the Ministry of Justice with the responsibilities for Integration, Immigration and Asylum Affairs.

The number of immigrants allowed into the Netherlands was reduced by enforcing the asylum-seekers law of 2000 rigidly. This law was created under the Second Kok cabinet by the then Mayor of Amsterdam, Job Cohen. Controversially, 26,000 asylum-seekers who had lived in the Netherlands for over five years but who had not been granted asylum were deported. Furthermore, partners of Dutch citizens are only allowed to immigrate into the Netherlands if the Dutch partner earns more than 120 percent of the minimum income. This income requirement has been decreased back to 100% of the minimum wage in 2010 as a result of the judgement of the EU Court in the Chakroun case.

Since 2006, family migrants from 'non-Western' countries who want to immigrate into the Netherlands must pass an integration test. It tests the applicant's knowledge of the Dutch language, political system and social conventions. The test must be taken before entering the Netherlands, in a Dutch Embassy or Consulates in the country of origin. Once in the Netherlands, migrants were obliged to pass a second test before receiving a permanent residence permit or being allowed to naturalise. 'Oudkomers', i.e. foreigners who have lived in the Netherlands for a long time, were obliged by the Dutch government to take the exam as well.

=== Economic Reform ===
The cabinet took power at a time when the Netherlands' economy was in poor shape, with increasing unemployment and slight economic contraction. To jump start economic growth, the cabinet has proposed tax cuts and reform of the system of social welfare.

The cabinet has implemented a new law for disability pensions. Most people enjoyed disability pensions under the old disability law received pensions even if they were only partially disabled and could still work. The pensions of these people have been cut, and so they are forced to return to the workforce. Furthermore, the cabinet has limited the possibility of early retirement. Without exception all Dutch employees will be forced to work until they have become 65, possibly longer.

The cabinet also has cut government spending by 5700 million euro, making a total of 11 billion euro, when combined with the cuts announced by the previous cabinet. Among other measures, free dental care, physiotherapy and anti-conception medication were cut, 12000 positions were to be eliminated in the armed forces and some of their bases closed, the link between benefit payment rates and salaries was to be broken, and the rental housing subsidy was reduced. At the same time, 4 billion euro in extra spending was made available, mainly in education and justice.

=== Government Reform ===
Another controversial issue is the reform of the Dutch political system. This was proposed to overcome the 'gap between politics and citizens', which became clear in the 2002 elections, which were dominated by the populist Pim Fortuyn who was later Assassinated during the election campaign. The cabinet appointed Thom de Graaf (D66) as Deputy Prime Minister and as a Minister without Portfolio within the Ministry of the Interior and Kingdom Relations with the responsibilities for Government Reform. Thom de Graaf (D66). De Graaf, who proposed an ambitious reform proposal, was met with much resistance. Two of the most important proposals were the directly elected mayor and the election system.

The Netherlands is one of the last countries in Europe not to have an elected mayor, instead he is appointed by the Crown. To change this the constitution has to be amended. A proposal to do this by former Minister of the Interior and Kingdom Relations Klaas de Vries (PvdA) in 2001, under the second Kok cabinet, was rejected in second reading by the Senate. This was because it would allow the controversial plans of De Graaf to be implemented. This would involve a mayor, directly elected by the city's population, who would have considerable power to take care of security and public order. The proposed election system would have preserved proportional representation but have done so with supplemental regional candidates.

On 23 March 2005, the Senate voted against a proposal to introduce a constitutional amendment that would allow the directly elected mayor. As a result, Thom de Graaf (D66) resigned as Deputy Prime Minister and Minister for Government Reform. The coalition parties then renegotiate a new coalition agreement. In the Easter weekend reached an agreement, the so-called Easter Accord. On 31 March 2005 Alexander Pechtold (D66) the Mayor of Wageningen and Chairman of the Democrats 66 was appointed as the new Minister for Government Reform. The position of Deputy Prime Minister was taken over by Minister of Economic Affairs Laurens Jan Brinkhorst (D66).

=== Opposition to policy ===
The cabinet was facing a lot of opposition, from the official opposition in the House of Representatives, from an extra-parliamentary movement, from international circles and from within. The left-wing parties in the House of Representatives where critical of the government. They perceived the policy on migration and integration as too hard and causing polarization between Dutch people and immigrants, and the economic reforms and budget cuts as untimely, because of the recession.

The extra-parliamentary movement "Keer het Tij" (Turn the Tide) has organized mass demonstrations against the government. Important partners within Keer het Tij where the three main left-wing opposition political parties the Labour Party (PvdA), Socialist Party and GreenLeft (GL), the largest trade union, the FNV, environmental organisations like Greenpeace and Milieu Defensie, and organisations of migrants. In 2004 they organized a political demonstration in the Hague. At the time the negotiations between the cabinet, the employers and the unions on early retirement had broken off, with the union leaders promising a "hot autumn".

Most international criticism comes from Belgium. Two ministers, the liberal minister of Foreign Affairs De Gucht and the Socialist vice-prime minister Van den Bossche of the purple Cabinet Verhofstadt II, have criticized the style of the Dutch cabinet, calling the prime minister Balkenende "Petty Bourgeois".

Criticism also rose out of the ranks of the largest government partner, the CDA. The former Christian-Democratic Prime Minister Dries van Agt and former leader of the parliamentary party, De Vries, criticized the cabinet for its anti-social policy. Minister Pechtold has opposed cabinet policy on terrorism and drug law in the media, breaking the unity of cabinet.

=== Resignations ===
In December 2003, the Minister of Foreign Affairs, Jaap de Hoop Scheffer, was appointed Secretary-General of the NATO. He was succeeded by former diplomat Ben Bot.

In June 2004 a personal conflict between State Secretary for Higher Education Nijs and Minister of Education Van der Hoeven caused the departure of Nijs. This in turn caused a reshuffle: State Secretary for Social Affairs Rutte became State Secretary for Higher Education and Henk van Hoof (a state secretary in previous cabinets) became State Secretary for Social Affairs.

State Secretary for Higher Education Mark Rutte left the cabinet to become parliamentary leader of the VVD on 28 June 2006. He was supposed to be succeeded by former alderman of The Hague Bruno Bruins, but the cabinet fell just a day before he was installed.

== 2006 cabinet crisis ==
On 29 June 2006, a cabinet crisis erupted after cabinet member Rita Verdonk lost the support of the coalition party D66 over the Ayaan Hirsi Ali identity fraud controversy.

Hirsi Ali, VVD member and Member of parliament at the time, had signed a statement in which she expressed regret that she had misinformed Minister Verdonk regarding her name. On 28 June, Hirsi Ali made it known that her statement was coerced. In a parliamentary debate on 28 June extending into the next day, Verdonk and the Prime Minister maintained that the purpose of this statement was a legal one: Hirsi Ali was required to declare her intention to keep the name Hirsi Ali in order to retain her passport. However, in a crucial moment during the debate, member of parliament Van Beek asked the Prime Minister about the purpose of the apology. The Prime Minister answered that "it was a statement that the Minister for Integration and Immigration had to be able to live with". This was interpreted widely as a political deal-making by Verdonk at the expense of Hirsi Ali and not just a legality.

As a result, a motion of no confidence was initiated by opposition party GroenLinks against Minister Verdonk. Coalition party D66 supported this motion with strong words, stating that either the minister had to go, or D66 would leave the cabinet. However, the motion did not get a majority vote. On 29 June, the Prime Minister issued a statement declaring that the ministers unanimously declared that the rejected motion did have no consequences for the cabinet (as it was not supported, the minister was not forced to go). The chairman of the parliamentary D66 group, Lousewies van der Laan then declared in a new parliamentary session that D66 could no longer support the entire cabinet.

The apparent dissent between the D66 cabinet ministers opinion (that Verdonk did not have to go) and the D66 parliamentary group opinion (that Verdonk had to go) resulted in some tense hours where it appeared that the two D66 cabinet ministers Laurens Jan Brinkhorst and Alexander Pechtold had broken away from their party, supporting the cabinet but not their party member Lousewies van der Laan. However, in a reconvened parliamentary session later that evening, Brinkhorst announced that he and Pechtold had resigned and supported their parliamentary group in this issue. The apparent difference was merely based on legality: Since the CDA and VVD ministers did not want to dismiss Verdonk, the D66 ministers could do nothing but state the obvious legal fact that an unsupported motion has no legal consequence. The political decision to leave the coalition was subsequently made by the parliamentary group.

Shortly after, Prime Minister Balkenende announced that all remaining members of the cabinet would offer their resignations (portfolios) to Queen Beatrix. At the end of that day, it was expected that new elections would be called for October 2006 at the earliest.

In the meantime, VVD and CDA blamed D66 for the cabinet's demise: they argued that Verdonk did in fact respect the wishes of parliament when she ordered the re-examination of Hirsi Ali's passport position. On his first day as parliamentary leader of the VVD, Mark Rutte was furious with D66, labeling their actions as scandalous. Lousewies van der Laan countered that she wanted only Verdonk and not the entire cabinet to resign, and that it was about the coerced statement, which she interpreted as abuse of power by the minister. She blamed VVD and CDA for keeping Verdonk as minister.

The newspaper Het Financieele Dagblad (FD) on 30 June commented that it was highly unusual for a cabinet to resign after surviving 29 June motion of no confidence. According to the FD, Balkenende made an "expensive miscalculation" and the coalition was not able to cope with "accumulation of governmental screw ups, ego maniacal told-you-so attitude and political profiteering". As Prime Minister, Balkenende should have steered his cabinet around the pitfalls. On the same day, the Volkskrant commented that D66 never was a strong supporter of this center-right cabinet and least of all a supporter of Verdonk. The newspaper described Balkenende as a poor leader with his ministers failing to acknowledge him. In short, the cabinet "slipped over a banana skin" according to this paper. NRC Handelsblad's main editorial praised D66 and put the blame on Balkenende for not being able to limit the damage to a single minister. The paper questioned whether the CDA should maintain him as their political leader.

The timing of the cabinet collapse was poorly chosen for the two remaining coalition parties: the economy was improving after 3 years of harsh reforms and little growth; finally, more people were working and unemployment rates showed a decline. The reforms initiated three years ago (one of them a 20 billion euro spending cut) were starting to deliver results. It was felt that CDA and VVD had not been able to benefit from it to its full potential. The polls had already showed improved voter support for VVD and CDA compared to the record-low results the year before. The 29 June Nova poll allotted 38 seats to the CDA, 31 seats to the VVD, and 3 seats to D66; a majority requires 76 seats.

With the collapse of the cabinet some of its initiatives became jeopardized: economic liberalization for gas utility companies, new rules for competition regulators, and liberalizations in the subsidized housing market. A demissionary cabinet would not have been able to tackle these issues but a minority government still could.

On 30 June 2006, the Prime Minister met with Queen Beatrix offering the resignation of the two D66 ministers and offering their portfolios to the other ministers. He expressed his preference for a minority government, a so-called rompkabinet. Maxime Verhagen of the CDA and Mark Rutte (VVD) also gave their support for this solution when they were invited for consultation with Beatrix. Two important considerations were imminent for them: the Dutch military NATO mission to Uruzgan, Afghanistan, and the decision on the 2007 budget to be made in September 2006. The main opposition leaders were in favor of a demissionary cabinet (without authority for new policies), and elections as soon as possible.

In an interview with NRC Handelsblad on 1 July, Alexander Pechtold raised his suspicion that VVD and CDA had already for a long time been prepared to drop D66 from the coalition in favor of the support by Pim Fortuyn List (LPF). According to Pechtold this explained the reluctance of VVD and CDA ministers to offer constructive solutions at the height of the crisis. The LPF expressed their support for a minority cabinet on numerous occasions, adding the irony that after the first Balkende cabinet failed in 2003 because of the destructive attitude of LPF, the same LPF was ready to replace D66.

=== 2006 Information round ===
Also on 1 July, Queen Beatrix appointed Minister of State and former United Nations High Commissioner for Refugees Ruud Lubbers as so-called informateur to see if a so-called rump cabinet could be formed. This would be a cabinet of CDA and VVD with a minority of seats in parliament, which would have to seek support from one or more opposition parties for every decision. At this stage, general elections were planned to take place in November 2006. According to Lubbers the prospective third Balkenende cabinet should be based on the coalition agreement of 2003 and the more recent Easter Accord.

Lubbers' information task was expected to take until 7 July with elections set at 22 November 2006. However, Lubbers was able to present his final conclusions to the Queen already on 5 July. Balkenende was then appointed as the so-called formateur with the actual task of forming a new cabinet. He appointed new ministers and presented a formal cabinet statement to parliament on 7 July 2006.

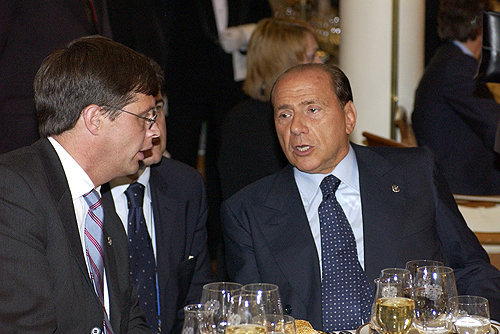
Prime Minister Jan Peter Balkenende and Prime Minister of Italy Silvio Berlusconi in Moscow on 31 May 2003.

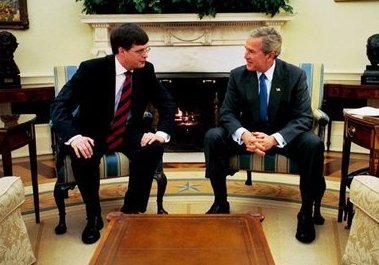
Prime Minister Jan Peter Balkenende and President of the United States George W. Bush in the Oval Office on 21 March 2004.

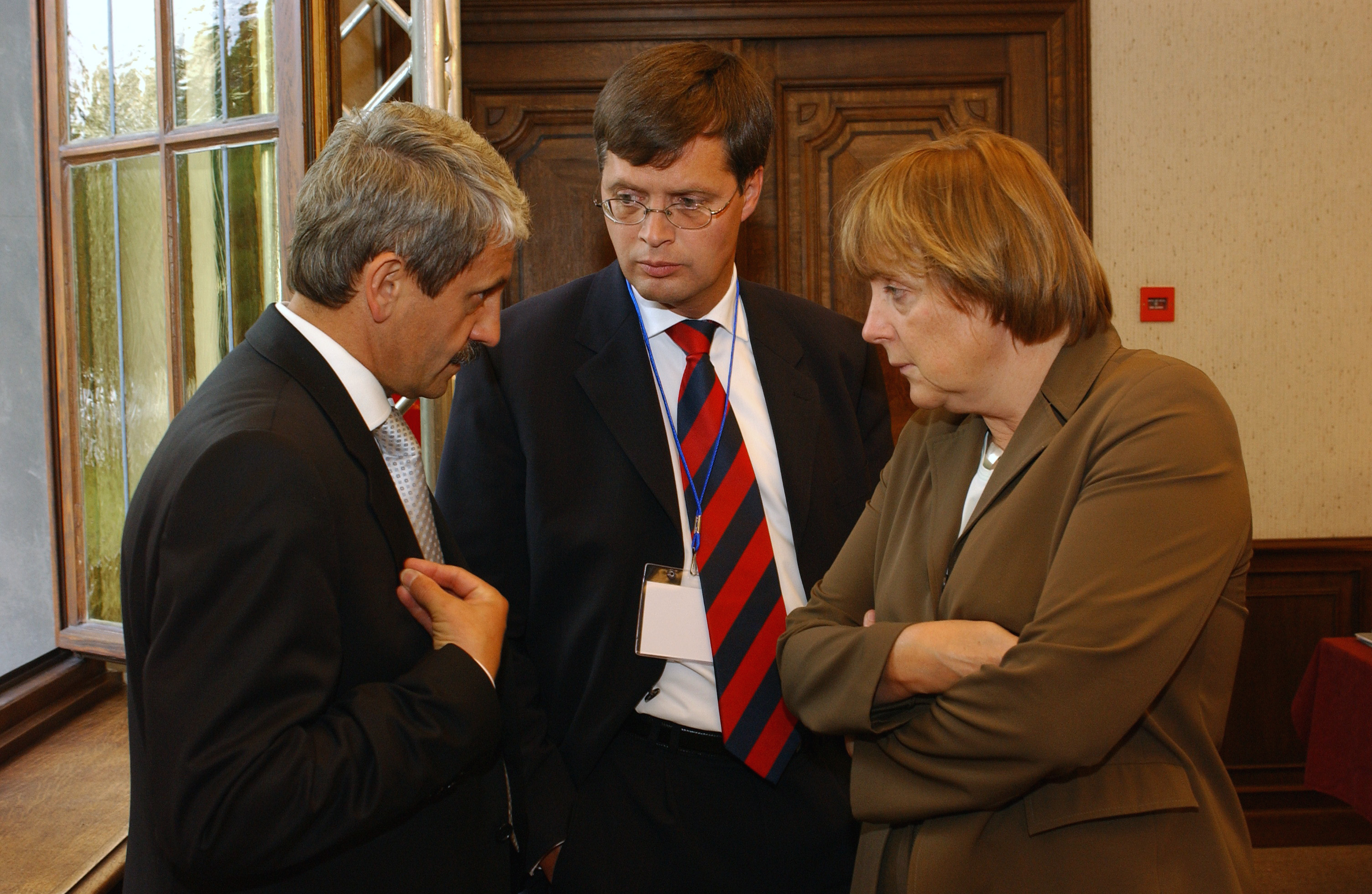
Prime Minister of Slovakia Mikuláš Dzurinda, Prime Minister Jan Peter Balkenende and German Christian Democratic Leader Angela Merkel at a European People's Party conference in Meise on 16 June 2004.

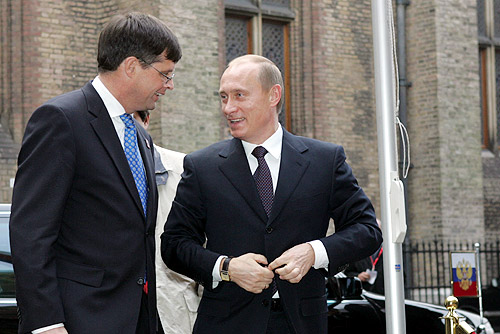
Prime Minister Jan Peter Balkenende and President of Russia Vladimir Putin at the Binnenhof on 25 November 2004.

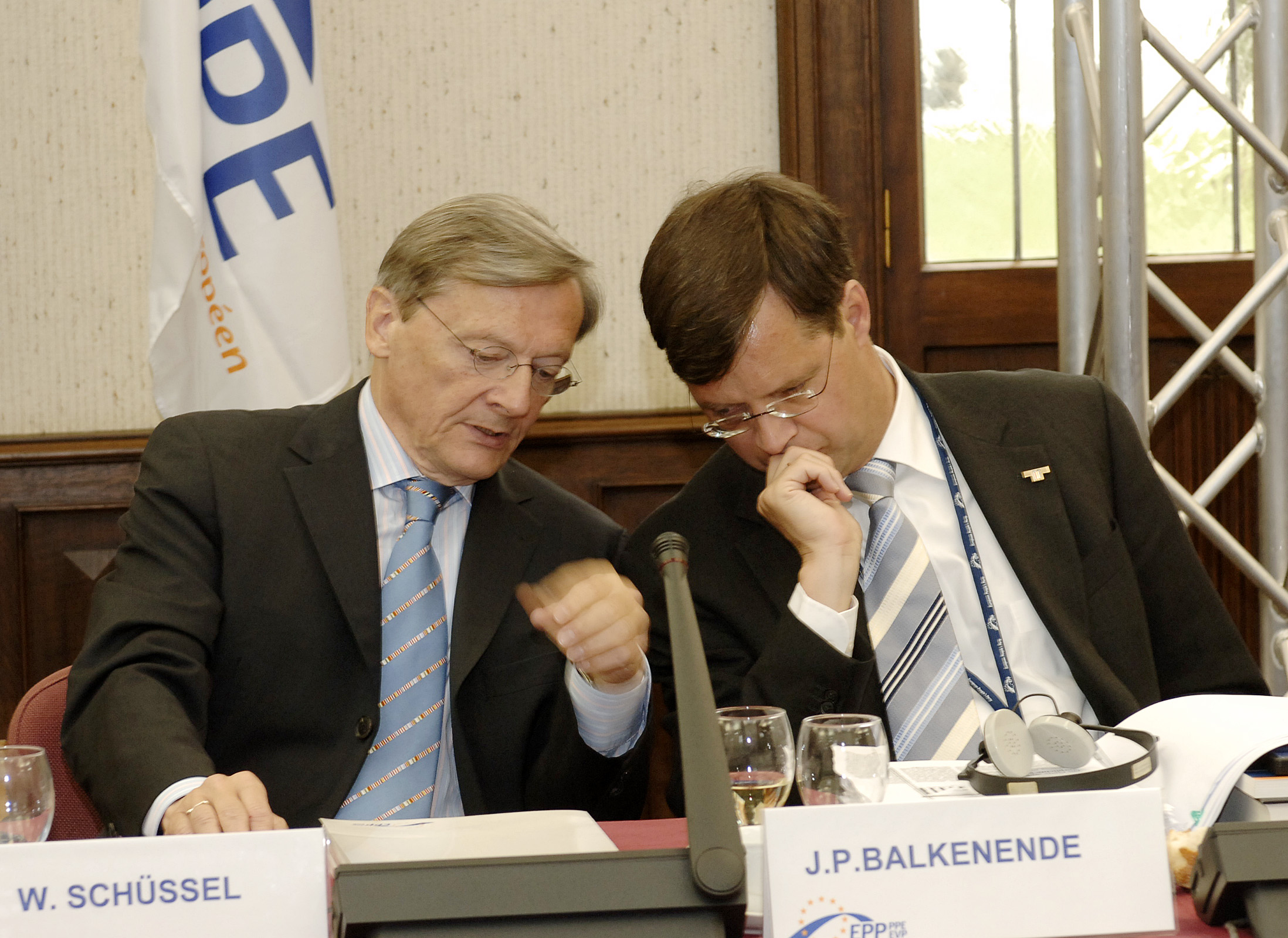
Chancellor of Austria Wolfgang Schüssel and Prime Minister Jan Peter Balkenende at a European People's Party conference in Meise on 15 June 2006.

== Cabinet members ==
Ministers		Title/Ministry/Portfolio(s)			Term of office	Party
Jan Peter Balkenende	Jan Peter; Balkenende (born 1956)	Prime Minister	General Affairs		22 July 2002 – 14 October 2010^{[Retained]} ^{[Continued]}	Christian; Democratic Appeal
Gerrit Zalm	Gerrit Zalm (born 1952)	Deputy Prime; Minister	Finance		27 May 2003 – 22 February 2007^{[Continued]}	People's Party for Freedom and Democracy
Gerrit Zalm	Gerrit Zalm (born 1952)	Minister	Finance		27 May 2003 – 22 February 2007^{[Continued]}	People's Party for Freedom and Democracy
Thom de Graaf	Thom de Graaf (born 1957)	Minister	Interior and Kingdom Relations	• Civil Reform • Municipalities • Urban Planning • Kingdom; Relations	27 May 2003 – 23 March 2005^{[Res]}	Democrats 66
Thom de Graaf	Thom de Graaf (born 1957)	Deputy Prime; Minister	Interior and Kingdom Relations	• Civil Reform • Municipalities • Urban Planning • Kingdom; Relations	27 May 2003 – 23 March 2005^{[Res]}	Democrats 66
Laurens Jan Brinkhorst	Laurens Jan; Brinkhorst (born 1937)	Deputy Prime; Minister	Economic Affairs		31 March 2005 – 3 July 2006^{[Res]}	Democrats 66
Laurens Jan Brinkhorst	Laurens Jan; Brinkhorst (born 1937)	Minister	Economic Affairs		27 May 2003 – 3 July 2006^{[Res]}	Democrats 66
Johan Remkes	Johan Remkes (born 1951)	Minister	Interior and Kingdom Relations		22 July 2002 – 22 February 2007^{[Retained]} ^{[Continued]}	People's Party for Freedom and Democracy
Jaap de Hoop Scheffer	Jaap de Hoop; Scheffer (born 1948)	Minister	Foreign Affairs		22 July 2002 – 3 December 2003^{[Retained]} ^{[App]}	Christian; Democratic Appeal
Ben Bot	Ben Bot (born 1937)	Minister	Foreign Affairs		3 December 2003 – 22 February 2007^{[Continued]}	Christian; Democratic Appeal
Piet Hein Donner	Piet Hein Donner (born 1948)	Minister	Justice		22 July 2002 – 21 September 2006^{[Retained]} ^{[Continued]}	Christian; Democratic Appeal
Henk Kamp	Henk Kamp (born 1952)	Minister	Defence		12 December 2002 – 22 February 2007^{[Retained]} ^{[Continued]}	People's Party for Freedom and Democracy
Hans Hoogervorst	Hans Hoogervorst (born 1956)	Minister	Health, Welfare and Sport		27 May 2003 – 22 February 2007^{[Continued]}	People's Party for Freedom and Democracy
Aart Jan de Geus	Aart Jan de Geus (born 1955)	Minister	Social Affairs and Employment		22 July 2002 – 22 February 2007^{[Retained]} ^{[Continued]}	Christian; Democratic Appeal
Maria van der Hoeven	Maria van der Hoeven (born 1949)	Minister	Education, Culture and Science		22 July 2002 – 22 February 2007^{[Retained]} ^{[Continued]}	Christian; Democratic Appeal
Karla Peijs	Karla Peijs (born 1944)	Minister	Transport and Water Management		27 May 2003 – 22 February 2007^{[Continued]}	Christian; Democratic Appeal
Cees Veerman	Cees Veerman (born 1949)	Minister	Agriculture, Nature and Fisheries		22 July 2002 – 1 July 2003^{[Retained]}	Christian; Democratic Appeal
Cees Veerman	Cees Veerman (born 1949)	Minister	Agriculture, Nature and Food Quality		1 July 2003 – 22 February 2007^{[Continued]}	Christian; Democratic Appeal
Sybilla Dekker	Sybilla Dekker (born 1942)	Minister	Housing, Spatial; Planning and the Environment		23 May 2003 – 21 September 2006^{[Continued]}	People's Party for Freedom and Democracy
Ministers without portfolio		Title/Ministry/Portfolio(s)			Term of office	Party
Alexander Pechtold	Alexander Pechtold (born 1965)	Minister	Interior and Kingdom Relations	• Civil Reform • Municipalities • Urban Planning • Kingdom; Relations	31 March 2005 – 3 July 2006^{[Res]}	Democrats 66
Agnes van Ardenne	Agnes van Ardenne (born 1950)	Minister	Foreign Affairs	• Development; Cooperation	27 May 2003 – 22 February 2007^{[Continued]}	Christian; Democratic Appeal
Rita Verdonk	Rita Verdonk (born 1955)	Minister	Justice	• Immigration and Asylum • Integration • Minorities	27 May 2003 – 14 December 2006^{[Continued]}	People's Party for Freedom and Democracy
State Secretaries		Title/Ministry/Portfolio(s)			Term of office	Party
Atzo Nicolaï	Atzo Nicolaï (1960–2020)	State Secretary^{[Title]}	Foreign Affairs	• European Union • Benelux	22 July 2002 – 7 July 2006^{[Retained]}	People's Party for Freedom and Democracy
Joop Wijn	Joop Wijn (born 1969)	State Secretary	Finance	• Fiscal Policy • Tax and Customs • Governmental; Budget	27 May 2003 – 7 July 2006	Christian; Democratic Appeal
Karien van Gennip	Karien van Gennip (born 1968)	State Secretary	Economic Affairs	• Trade and Export • Small and Medium-sized; Businesses • Regional; Development • Consumer; Protection • Tourism	27 May 2003 – 22 February 2007^{[Continued]}	Christian; Democratic Appeal
Cees van der Knaap	Cees van der Knaap (born 1951)	State Secretary	Defence	• Human; Resources • Equipment	22 July 2002 – 18 December 2007^{[Retained]} ^{[Continued]}	Christian; Democratic Appeal
Clémence Ross-van Dorp	Clémence Ross- van Dorp (born 1957)	State Secretary	Health, Welfare and Sport	• Elderly Care • Youth Care • Disability Policy • Medical Ethics • Sport	22 July 2002 – 22 February 2007^{[Retained]} ^{[Continued]}	Christian; Democratic Appeal
Mark Rutte	Mark Rutte (born 1967)	State Secretary	Social Affairs and Employment	• Social Security • Unemployment • Occupational; Safety • Social Services	22 July 2002 – 17 June 2004^{[Retained]} ^{[App]}	People's Party for Freedom and Democracy
Henk van Hoof	Henk van Hoof (born 1947)	State Secretary	Social Affairs and Employment	• Social Security • Unemployment • Occupational; Safety • Social Services	17 June 2004 – 22 February 2007^{[Continued]}	People's Party for Freedom and Democracy
Annette Nijs	Annette Nijs (born 1961)	State Secretary	Education, Culture and Science	• Higher; Education • Adult; Education • Science Policy	22 July 2002 – 9 June 2004^{[Retained]} ^{[Res]}	People's Party for Freedom and Democracy
Mark Rutte	Mark Rutte (born 1967)	State Secretary	Education, Culture and Science	• Higher; Education • Adult; Education • Science Policy	17 June 2004 – 27 June 2006^{[Res]}	People's Party for Freedom and Democracy
Bruno Bruins	Bruno Bruins (born 1963)	State Secretary	Education, Culture and Science	• Higher; Education • Adult; Education • Science Policy	29 June 2006 – 22 February 2007^{[Continued]}	People's Party for Freedom and Democracy
Medy van der Laan	Medy van der Laan (born 1968)	State Secretary	Education, Culture and Science	• Media • Culture • Art	27 May 2003 – 3 July 2006^{[Res]}	Democrats 66
Melanie Schultz van Haegen	Melanie Schultz van Haegen (born 1970)	State Secretary	Transport and Water Management	• Public; Infrastructure • Public; Transport • Aviation • Rail Transport • Water; Management • Weather; Forecasting	22 July 2002 – 22 February 2007^{[Retained]} ^{[Continued]}	People's Party for Freedom and Democracy
Pieter van Geel	Pieter van Geel (born 1951)	State Secretary	Housing, Spatial; Planning and the Environment	• Environmental; Policy	22 July 2002 – 22 February 2007^{[Retained]} ^{[Continued]}	Christian; Democratic Appeal

^{Resigned}
^{Continued in the next cabinet}
^{Retained from the previous cabinet}
^{Designated with the diplomatic rank of Minister}
^{Appointed Secretary General of NATO}
^{Appointed State Secretary for Education, Culture and Science}
