= Rein Jan Hoekstra =

Dutch politician and civil servant (1941–2025)

Rein Jan Hoekstra (25 November 1941 – 11 January 2025) was a Dutch jurist. He was born in Dokkum. He graduated from the University of Groningen in 1965, majoring in Law. He later worked as an attorney (1965–1970), Chief of Staff to Prime Minister Ruud Lubbers in 1983, and Secretary General at the Ministry of General Affairs (1986–1994). In 1994, he became a member of the Raad van State, the highest administrative court in the Netherlands.

In 2003 he was an informateur for the Crown along with Frits Korthals Altes of the People's Party for Freedom and Democracy (VVD), helping to form the second Balkenende cabinet. On 25 November 2006 he was again appointed by the Queen as informateur, during the 2006-2007 Dutch cabinet formation after the parliamentary elections of 2006, helping to form the fourth Balkenende cabinet.

Rein Jan Hoekstra was a member of the Christian Democratic Appeal (CDA). He was married and had one daughter.

Hoekstra died on 11 January 2025, at the age of 83.
