= Singapore International Energy Week =

- Frequency: Annual
- Location: Singapore
- Founded: 2008
- Most recent: 2020
- Participants: 20,000 in 2011
- Organiser: Energy Market Authority
- Website: siew.sg

Singapore International Energy Week (SIEW), formerly called the International Energy Week, is an annual week-long energy conference comprising several exhibitions, workshops, and networking sessions focused on fundamental issues within the energy industry. Held since 2008, it is organized by the Energy Market Authority.

== Events ==
=== 2008: "Powering Cities of the Future" ===
The inaugural International Energy Week took place from 3–7 November 2008 at the Raffles City Convention Centre, Singapore, and was attended by 2500 people.

The program featured a range of industry topics addressing energy investment, energy efficiency, traditional, renewable and alternative energies, climate change, and green architecture. Program highlights included the delivery of the inaugural Singapore Energy Lecture by Lee Kuan Yew, former prime minister of the Republic of Singapore to an audience of 500 people, and presentations by industry leaders and multi-national energy companies.

During the event, the Government of Singapore announced the establishment of a 25 million Singapore dollars (16.8 million U.S. dollars) Energy Research and Development Fund to support the proliferation of new energy technologies in Singapore. Also during the event, Vestas Wind Systems, an official partner of Singapore International Energy in 2008, opened its largest research facility outside of its home country of Denmark.

=== 2009: "Clean Energy: Sustainable Solutions for Urban Cities" ===
Singapore International Energy Week 2009 took place from 16 to 20 November at the Shangri-la Hotel in Singapore.

Over 1,800 companies and 5,000 participants registered for events during the week.

On the opening day, the second annual Singapore Energy Lecture was delivered by Daniel Yergin, the Chairman & co-founder of Cambridge Energy Research Associates. In his speech, Yergin discussed the development of unconventional shale gas, calling it "one of the most important innovations of this decade" - and that the use of natural gas is expected to grow substantially in Asia, especially in Liquefied natural gas (LNG) form. He also said that oil supply will be supplied by the use of technological innovations, as only about a fifth of the oil reserves that could be recovered had been extracted.

Also on the first day, former British Prime Minister Tony Blair shared his views about balancing climate change and global energy needs, in a video message shown on the first day.

The Clean Energy Expo Asia (CEEA) - a trade fair and conference- took place during the event. The Expo featured five pavilions, showcasing clean energy solutions from Australia, Brazil, Europe, Japan and Singapore. The EMA's Deputy Chief Executive, David Tan, delivered an address at the Expo.

During the event, the EMA hosted the inaugural Singapore Electric Vehicle Roundtable where the "challenges and solutions in EV implementation" were discussed. The EMA also announced a project to power Pulau Ubin (one of Singapore's islands) completely with renewable energy. At the time of the announcement, the island had no power grid. The EMA also announced a 'smart' electrical grid project to be implemented at the Nanyang Technological University and the Jalan Bahar Cleantech Park. This was announced at the opening address to the Smart Grids Conference by Lawrence Wong (Chief Executive of the EMA).

The Solar Energy Research Institute of Singapore (headed by Joachim Luther) was officially opened, with the stated aim of "investing $130 million into the industry in the next five years."

Other events included the launch of World Energy Outlook 2009 by the International Energy Agency's Executive Director Nobuo Tanaka, the Singapore Electricity Roundtable and the Platts 4th Annual Top 250 Global Energy Companies Awards and Leadership Dinner (part of a three-year partnership between Platts and EMA).

A number of energy industry experts including Alan Bryden (Ingénieur Général of the High Council for Industry, Energy and Technologies, France), Nobuo Tanaka (executive director of the International Energy Agency), Bill Hogan (Research Director of the Harvard Electricity Policy Group) and David Hone (Royal Dutch Shell's senior adviser on climate change) spoke during the week.

=== 2010: "Fueling the Smart Energy Economy" ===
The third Singapore International Energy Week (SIEW) took place from 27 October to 4 November 2010. For the first time, Panasonic acted as a main sponsor for the event.

Approximately 14,000 people were involved with the event, including government officials, business leaders, academics, investors, as well as representatives from energy-resource and environmental companies from 60 countries.

On 1 November, Singapore's Prime Minister Lee Hsien Loong delivered the Singapore Energy Lecture, where he discussed Singapore's energy plans in an uncertain time with regard to future prices and climate change. He also discussed the possibility of a nuclear power plant on Singapore "possibly during my life time... we cannot afford to dismiss the option of nuclear power altogether".

On 2 November, at the Power-GEN Asia Conference, Senior Minister of State for Trade and Industry and Education, S. Iswaran announced Singapore's plans to build a third liquefied natural gas (LNG) tank.

Other events held during SIEW 2010 included Carbon Forum Asia, Clean Energy Expo Asia, IPEC (International Power and Energy Conference) 2010, Platts Top 250 Awards Dinner, Singapore Electricity Roundtable, Bloomberg New Energy Finance Dinner and Downstream Asia.

=== 2011: "Securing our Energy Future" ===
The fourth Singapore International Energy Week (SIEW) took place from 31 October to 4 November 2011.

20,000 people and 550 exhibitors participated in the event, including government officials, business leaders, academics, investors, as well as representatives from energy-resource and environmental companies from 60 countries.

On 31 October, former executive director of the International Energy Agency Nobuo Tanaka delivered the Singapore Energy Lecture, where he shared his "21st century energy security" vision and called for Asia's emerging economies to engage in more active collaborations for the future. He noted that one country cannot enhance its energy security by risking the energy security of others, and thus the need for a new framework on energy security.

The Lecture was followed by the Singapore Energy Summit, where global energy leaders took the stage to discuss pertinent energy issues. Sharing the stage for the first time were the CEOs of Royal Dutch Shell and Petrobras, Peter Voser and José Gabrielli respectively, as they discuss the future of the global energy industry. According to Peter Voser, Shell expects Asia to be a key growth region in the long term. However, energy leaders at the Singapore Energy Summit also stated that Asia faces a rocky road ahead in securing energy needs.

Giving their perspectives on energy security concerns and new trends in the power industry at the Singapore Energy Summit, Singapore's Second Minister S. Iswaran, Malaysia's Dato' Sri Idris Jala, and the Philippines' Secretary of Energy Jose Rene Almendras unanimously agreed that a connected Asean power grid was a crucial step for energy security in the region. Such a grid, to be done in phases, would integrate Asean's energy markets, and would require investments into trans-Asean gas pipelines and expanding connections between member countries. Minister S. Iswaran also stated that such plans needed clear political direction at the regional and national levels, adding that an Asean energy grid would serve individual national interests as well as the region as a whole.

The annual energy gathering also hosted three new major events, PV Asia Pacific Expo, Asia Smart Grid and the EMART Asia, covering a range of issues including energy efficiency, renewable energy and energy trading. Returning to SIEW this year were Clean Energy Expo Asia, Carbon Forum Asia, Downstream Asia, Singapore Electricity Roundtable, and the Platts Top 250 Global Energy Companies Asia Awards Dinner.

=== 2012: "Shaping a New Energy Landscape" ===
SIEW 2012 took place from 22 to 25 October at the Sands Expo & Convention Centre, Marina Bay Sands Singapore.

With the theme of "Shaping a New Energy Landscape", Singapore's Minister in the Prime Minister's Office and Second Minister for Home Affairs & Trade and Industry, S. Iswaran, made several announcements with regard to Singapore's energy security. This included the city-state's plans to build a fourth liquefied natural gas (LNG) storage tank at the LNG terminal on Jurong Island, which would open up opportunities in global LNG markets.

The Opening Keynote Address was presented by International Energy Agency Director Maria van der Hoeven with the theme of "Asia and the Global Energy Economy". She shared that Singapore was well-placed to be an Asian gas hub "faster than anyone else in the region". Ms van der Hoeven also underscored that natural gas will be vital to powering Asia's massive electrification in the years ahead.

Other energy leaders spoke as well, including Malaysia's Minister of Energy Peter Chin Fah Kui, Lao's Minister of Energy and Mines Soulivong Daravong, the Director General of the International Renewable Energy Agency Dr Adnan Z Amin, and the President of Carbon War Room (an independent non-profit organisation focused on the global transition to a low carbon economy) and former President of Costa Rica Jose Maria Figueres. They discussed topics ranging from options for a future energy mix to financing the energy needs of tomorrow, from climate change and connecting the dots for the energy-water-food nexus.

The event hosted two new events:

1. Gas Asia Summit (GAS), presenting the first dedicated Asian gas and LNG conference to respond to the region's natural gas and LNG demand and energy supply security.
2. Asia Future Energy Forum (AFEF):, the Asia debut of the World Future Energy Forum on leading-edge sustainable energy governance, business, investment, finance, and technology that enable smart delivery of clean energy solutions.

Also forming part of the event were Asia Smart Grid, Downstream Asia, EMART Asia, Singapore Electricity Roundtable, and the Platts Top 250 Global Energy Companies Asia Awards Dinner, as well as the inaugural In Dialogue with Youth, an outreach event to engage youths on energy issues.

=== 2013: "New Horizons in Energy" ===
The sixth Singapore International Energy Week was held from 28 October to 1 November 2013 at the Sands Expo and Convention Centre, Marina Bay Sands Singapore, with the theme "New Horizons in Energy".

S. Iswaran, Minister in the Prime Minister's Office and Second Minister for Home Affairs and Trade & Industry, unveiled Singapore's upcoming implementation of an electricity demand response programme in 2015, and an electricity futures market targeted to be launched in end-2014.

The panel discussions under SES cover the prospective impact of gas and its potential to play a larger role in fuelling Asia, the energy map of the future, the resurgence in fossil fuels and necessary initiatives to adopt "green growth". The energy leaders who took part in the panels include Hiroshi Ozaki, President of Osaka Gas; Meg Gentle, President of Cheniere Marketing; Amos Hochstein, Deputy Assistant Secretary for Energy Diplomacy, Bureau of Energy Resources, US Department of State; and Gal Luft, co- Director, Institute for the Analysis of Global Security. The SIEW Opening Keynote Address was presented by Sheikh Khalid Bin Khalifa Al-Thani, CEO of Qatargas, today QatarEnergy LNG, the world's largest producer of liquefied natural gas (LNG). He assessed the diverse challenges facing the global gas market – including the pricing, outlook and structural issues in North America, Europe and Asia.

The roundtables at SIEW focused on niche topic areas within the energy space. One example is the opportunities and challenges for electro mobility in cities. The sixth SIEW also launched the inaugural Singapore Energy Awards, which was presented by Iswaran, to Energy Carta.

=== 2016: "New Energy Realities" ===
The ninth edition of Singapore International Energy Week (SIEW) took place from 24 to 28 October 2016. More than 13,000 delegates from more than 60 countries attended the event.

=== 2017: "Rethinking Energy; Navigating Change" ===
The 10th edition of Singapore International Energy Week (SIEW) was held from 23 to 27 October 2017. The event gathered more than 11,000 delegates from over 70 countries to explore the next steps towards a sustainable energy future.

=== 2018: "Transforming Energy: Invest, Innovate and Integrate" ===
The 11th edition of Singapore International Energy Week (SIEW) took place from 29 October to 2 November 2018. The event gathered more than 13,000 senior government officials, industry captains, and academics to discuss key energy issues under the theme "Transforming Energy: Invest, Innovate, and Integrate". For the first time, the 36th ASEAN Energy Ministers of Energy Meeting (AMEM) was held together with SIEW as part of Singapore's Chairmanship of ASEAN.

Minister of Trade and Industry, Chan Chun Sing, delivered the SIEW Opening Remarks about how Singapore is improving its production, management, and consumption of energy to overcome the trilemma of making its energy supply affordable, sustainable, and reliable. The SIEW Opening Keynote (SOK) was delivered by Dr Fatih Birol, executive director, International Energy Agency (IEA) and John Abbott, Downstream Director and Member of the executive committee at Shell. Dr Birol spoke about the important changes needed in the energy market to meet rising global demand, and Mr. Abbott said that it is only by constantly listening, learning, and working together will any energy sector transformation become a reality.

=== 2019: "Accelerating Energy Transformation" ===
The 12th edition of Singapore International Energy Week (SIEW) took place from 29 October to 1 November 2019 at the Sands Expo and Convention Centre, Marina Bay Sands Singapore. "Accelerating Energy Transformation" was announced on 29 March 2019 as the theme for SIEW by Ngiam Shih Chun, Chief Executive of the Energy Market Authority of Singapore.

Minister of Trade and Industry, Chan Chun Sing, delivered the SIEW Opening Remarks and spoke about Singapore's Energy Story and its four energy supply switches, to guide how Singapore needs to do more to prepare itself for the next wave of change and transformation of its energy landscape.
