= Sustainable and Green Finance Institute =

Singaporean research institute

- Abbreviation: SGFIN
- Formation: 20 April 2023
- Type: Research institute
- Headquarters: National University of Singapore; Innovation 4.0; 3 Research Link #02-02; Singapore 117602
- Location: Singapore
- Chairperson: Professor Chng Wee Joo
- Managing Director: Sumit Agarwal
- Director: Johan Sulaeman
- Deputy Director: Zhang Weina
- Website: sgfin.nus.edu.sg

The Sustainable and Green Finance Institute (SGFIN) is a research institute established by the National University of Singapore (NUS), to provide multidisciplinary research and training with the aim of shaping sustainability outcomes and policymaking across the corporate and financial sectors, and determine ways in which finance can advance sustainability across various economic activities. SGFIN is one of 39 university-level research institutes and centers at NUS.

== History ==
=== Establishment ===
With the support of Monetary Authority of Singapore (MAS), SGFIN was set up as one of three Centres of Excellence (CoEs), to develop sustainable finance research and a talent development ecosystem, tailored to the needs in Singapore and Asia.

The institute was officially launched on 20 April 2023 by then Deputy Prime Minister and Minister for Finance, Mr. Lawrence Wong, at Shaw Foundation Alumni House at NUS campus.

=== Organization ===
Professor Sumit Agarwal, Low Tuck Kwong Distinguished Professor of Finance at the NUS Business School, is the institute's Managing Director. He is also a Professor of Economics and Real Estate at NUS. SGFIN operates with 20+ full-time researchers, supported by administrative staff and student research assistants from across NUS campus. SGFIN operates from its premises at innovation4.0 building at NUS Kent Ridge campus.

== Programs and initiatives ==
=== Applied research ===
One of the primary research areas of SGFIN involves the development of a framework to measure and assess sustainability impact of corporations. This framework aims to determine the value of companies' environmental and social performance, by employing contemporary statistical techniques and advanced machine learning tools.

=== Educational programs ===
The institute offers a graduate education program as well as a portfolio of executive education programs. Its graduate education program, Master of Science (MSc) in Sustainable and Green Finance, is offered jointly with NUS Business School. Launched in 2022, this program was initially available only as a full-time course but has expanded to include a part-time option starting in 2024. Additionally, the institute offers a range of executive education (non-degree) programs designed to meet the needs of industry professionals.

=== Events and conferences ===
Keynote events organized by the institute include its annual SGFIN Sustainability Summit, which gather a number of experts from the sustainable finance community. The 2024 edition of the summit featured keynote speeches by Deputy Prime Minister Heng Swee Keat and Dr Michael Greenstone, along with panel discussions covering key topics in sustainable finance, such as developing energy infrastructures to separate emissions from economic activity, navigating regulatory and legal changes for net-zero transitions, advancing beyond current standards in the built environment, and utilizing digital innovations to achieve sustainability goals.

In the same series, SGFIN also holds the SGFIN Research Conference on Sustainability, which delves deeper into the themes of sustainability through academic research presentations, exploring topics such as the intersection of finance, technological innovations, and regulations.

=== Thought leadership ===
SGFIN actively involves its directors and research affiliates in advancing thought leadership in Singapore by sharing insights across various domains, such as sustainability, finance, and energy transitions. Some discussion points that have been explored include integrating executive compensation with ESG criteria, promoting low-carbon transitions, and effectiveness of a regional taxonomy and framework to support ASEAN sustainability goals.

In a collaboration with Accounting and Corporate Regulatory Authority (ACRA), SGFIN conducted a research study on climate-related disclosures in Singapore, which highlighted the progress and challenges faced by Singapore-listed companies in climate reporting. While Singapore companies are making good progress, there is a need for stronger governance disclosures, to demonstrate board involvement in setting performance goals, as well as the disclosure of interim milestones to help stakeholders to gauge progress toward long-term net-zero goals.

=== Industry engagement ===
SGFIN has been engaged in various initiatives and collaborations with various industry partners, contributing to the discourse on sustainable finance and climate-related topics. The institute has actively participated in and moderated panels at significant events such as the Singapore FinTech Festival, CleanEnviro Summit and the Singapore International Chamber of Commerce's Sustainability Event Series.

Other noteworthy external events include the Asian Downstream Summit, the Singapore International Energy Week, and multiple forums focusing on green finance and energy transition.

SGFIN also organized and participated in educational and outreach initiatives, such as the SGFIN-Fidelity Sustainable Finance Case Competition and the Huawei Tech4City Competition. The institute also regularly invites external speakers, consisting of industry representatives and NUS academic staff, to speak to the cohort from the Master of Science (MSc) in Sustainable and Green Finance program.

== Publications ==
1. Agarwal, S.; Ghosh, P.; Zheng, H. (2024). "Consumption response to a natural disaster: Evidence of price and income shocks from Chennai flood". Energy Economics. 131 107323. Bibcode:2024EneEc.13107323A. doi:10.1016/j.eneco.2024.107323.
2. Agarwal, S.; Ding, Y.H.; Kuang, W.D.; Zhu, X. (2023). "Are environmental punishments good news or bad news? Evidence from China". Journal of Environmental Economics and Management. 120 102847. Bibcode:2023JEEM..12002847A. doi:10.1016/j.jeem.2023.102847.
3. Liu, C.; Shu, T.; Sulaeman, J.; Yeung, P. (2023). "Life is Too Short? Bereaved Managers and Investment Decisions". Review of Finance. 27 (4): 1373–1421. doi:10.1093/rof/rfac067.
4. Agarwal, S.; Han, Y.; Qin, Y.; Zhu, H. (2023). "Disguised pollution: industrial activities in the dark". Journal of Public Economics. 223 104904. doi:10.1016/j.jpubeco.2023.104904.
5. Gefen, O.; Reeb, D.; Sulaeman, J. (2023). "Startups' demand for accounting expertise: evidence from a randomized field experiment". Review of Accounting Studies. 29 (4): 3019–3052. doi:10.1007/s11142-023-09775-8. hdl:10397/99854.
6. Lin, Y.; Qin, Y.; Sulaeman, J.; Yan, J.; Zhang, J. (2023). "Expanding footprints: The impact of passenger transportation on corporate locations". Review of Finance. 27 (3): 1119–1154. doi:10.1093/rof/rfac049.
7. Agarwal, S.; Tan, P.L.; Tan-Soo, J.S. (2023). "Long-term effects of air pollution on Singapore's national university admissions". Applied Economics Letters. 31 (13): 1178–1183. doi:10.1080/13504851.2023.2177586.
8. Agarwal, S.; Araral, E.; Fan, M.; Yu, Q.; Zheng, H. (2023). "The effects of policy announcement, prices and subsidies on water consumption". Nature Water. 1 (2): 176–186. doi:10.1038/s44221-023-00028-1.
9. Agarwal, S.; Sing, T.F.; Sultana, M. (2022). "Public media campaign and energy conservation: A natural experiment in Singapore". Energy Economics. 114 106281. Bibcode:2022EneEc.11406281A. doi:10.1016/j.eneco.2022.106281.
10. Agarwal, S.; Araral, E.; Fan, M.; Yu, Q.; Zheng, H. (2022). "Water conservation through plumbing and nudging". Nature Human Behaviour. 6 (6): 858–867. doi:10.1038/s41562-022-01320-y. PMID 35361909.
11. Agarwal, S.; Long, W.; Yang, Y. (2021). "Impact of transboundary air pollution on service quality and consumer satisfaction". Journal of Economic Behavior and Organization. 192: 357–380. doi:10.1016/j.jebo.2021.10.002.
12. Agarwal, S.; Yu, Q.; Shi, L.; Wei, G.; Zhu, H. (2021). "Impact of temperature on morbidity: New evidence from China". Journal of Environmental Economics and Management. 109 102495. Bibcode:2021JEEM..10902495A. doi:10.1016/j.jeem.2021.102495.
13. Agarwal, S.; Sing, T. F.; Yang, Y. (2020). "The impact of transboundary haze pollution on household utilities consumption". Energy Economics. 85 104591. Bibcode:2020EneEc..8504591A. doi:10.1016/j.eneco.2019.104591.
14. Nofsinger, J. R.; Sulaeman, J.; Varma, A. (2019). "Institutional investors and corporate social responsibility". Journal of Corporate Finance. 58: 700–725. doi:10.1016/j.jcorpfin.2019.07.012.
15. Agarwal, S.; Deng, Y.; Li, T. (2019). "Environmental regulation as a double-edged sword for housing markets: Evidence from the NOx budget trading program". Journal of Environmental Economics and Management. 96: 286–309. doi:10.1016/j.jeem.2019.06.006.
16. Lam, S. S.; Zhang, W.; Chien, C. Y. K. (2018). Hoffmann, Paolo Saona (ed.). "Can corporate social responsibility fill institutional voids". Firm Value-Theory and Empirical Evidence. 2nd ed. IntechOpen. doi:10.5772/intechopen.72333. ISBN 978-1-78923-494-7.
17. Agarwal, S.; Rengarajan, S.; Sing, T. F.; Yang, Y. (2017). "Nudges from school children and electricity conservation: Evidence from the "Project Carbon Zero" campaign in Singapore". Energy Economics. 61: 29–41. Bibcode:2017EneEc..61...29A. doi:10.1016/j.eneco.2016.10.014.
18. Agarwal, S.; Wang, L.; Yang, Z. (2018). "Blessing in disguise? Environmental shocks and performance enhancement". Journal of Economic Behavior and Organization. doi:10.2139/ssrn.3218812.
