= Clean Energy Expo Asia =

Trade fair and conference

The Clean Energy Expo Asia is a trade fair and conference which takes place annual during Singapore International Energy Week (SIEW).

It was held for the first time at SIEW 2009 It featured five pavilions, showcasing clean energy developments from Australia, Brazil, Europe, Japan and Singapore. The Energy Market Authority's Deputy Chief Executive, David Tan, delivered an address at the Expo.

The second Expo took place at SIEW 2010.
