= Sumit Agarwal =

Indian economist

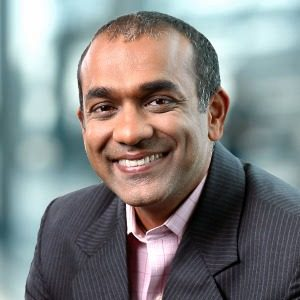
- Born: Uttar Pradesh, India
- Occupation: Academic
- Title: Low Tuck Kwong Distinguished Professorship

Academic background
- Education: University of Wisconsin–Milwaukee (Ph.D. in Economics)
- Alma mater: University of Wisconsin–Milwaukee

Academic work
- Institutions: National University of Singapore
- Main interests: Financial Economics, Corporate Finance, Real estate economics
- Website: www.ushakrisna.com

Sumit Agarwal is an Indian academic who is the Low Tuck Kwong Distinguished Professor of Finance and a professor of Economics and Real Estate at the National University of Singapore (NUS). He is also Managing Director of Sustainable and Green Finance Institute (SGFIN) at NUS, as well as President of Asian Bureau of Finance and Economic Research.

== Early life and education ==
Agarwal was born in a small town in Uttar Pradesh, India, and spent the first six years of his life there before moving to Africa with his family. His father, an economist working for the World Bank, moved the family to Tanzania and later Uganda. These early experiences influenced his later academic and professional focus on economic policy and consumer protection.

After completing his secondary education at a boarding school in India, he moved to the United States to pursue higher education at the University of Wisconsin–Milwaukee. He graduated with a Bachelor of Science degree in Computer science. He later went on to complete a Master of Arts and a Doctor of Philosophy (PhD), both in Economics.

== Career ==
Agarwal began his career in the financial sector, where he held the position of senior vice president and credit risk management executive in the Small Business Risk Solutions Group of Bank of America. During this time, he was involved in creating high-risk financial products that contributed to the 2008 financial crisis. Disillusioned by the lack of response to his warnings about the risks, he left the banking industry and joined the Federal Reserve, where he played a significant role in addressing the crisis.

As a senior financial economist at the Federal Reserve Bank of Chicago, he focused on banking malpractices and consumer protection, helping to shape policies aimed at regulating the financial sector and protecting consumers.

In 2012, Agarwal transitioned to academia, joining the National University of Singapore (NUS) as a professor. His research, which spans behavioral economics, consumer finance, and public policy, has been published in top academic journals and has influenced policy decisions worldwide. He has received several awards for his research at NUS, including the institution's Outstanding Researcher Award. His work often explores how government policies can protect socially disadvantaged individuals and improve public welfare.

From 2016 to 2018, Agarwal was also a professor of finance at the Business School in Georgetown University in Washington, D.C.. There, he conducted research studies focusing on various issues, including the impact of ObamaCare on unemployment and its broader benefits.

He currently serves as a Low Tuck Kwong Distinguished Professor of Finance and a professor of Economics and Real Estate at the National University of Singapore (NUS). Agarwal was appointed as the founding managing director of Sustainable and Green Finance Institute at NUS in July 2022, when the institute was launched as an intelligence hub for the region's sustainable finance community. He is also the President of Asian Bureau of Finance and Economic Research.

== Research ==
Agarwal has made contributions to the areas of financial economics, corporate finance, and real estate economics.

One of Agarwal's research works is a study on the financial decision-making process over the life cycle, done together with John C. Driscoll from the board of governors of the Federal Reserve System, and Xavier Gabaix and David Laibson from Harvard University (Department of Economics). Here, he explores how aging affects financial sophistication and decision-making. In this study, it was highlighted that financial mistakes are common among consumers, especially older adults. By analyzing a proprietary database, the researchers found that financial mistakes follow a U-shaped pattern, with middle-aged adults making the fewest mistakes. The study discusses various regulatory regimes that could help individuals avoid financial errors, focusing on disclosure, nudges, financial driving licenses, advanced directives, fiduciaries, and asset safe harbors. Agarwal's work in this area underscores the need for regulations that consider the cognitive decline in older adults, influencing policies around consumer financial products.

Together with Andrea Presbitero from International Monetary Fund (IMF); Centre for Economic Policy Research (CEPR), and André F. Silva and Carlo Wix, Agarwal has investigated the redistribution effects of credit card rewards programs, examining how different consumer segments are affected by these incentives. The study finds that sophisticated consumers, regardless of income, benefit from reward cards, while naive consumers end up paying higher costs. This is due to reward cards encouraging more spending, which can lead to higher unpaid balances for naive consumers who follow sub-optimal repayment strategies. Banks incentivize the use of reward cards by offering lower interest rates. The study estimates an annual redistribution of $15 billion from less educated to more educated, poorer to richer, and high to low minority areas, exacerbating existing disparities.

Agarwal has also studied the effects of financial regulation on consumer behavior, particularly in the context of credit cards. His research on the Credit Card Accountability, Responsibility, and Disclosure (CARD) Act of 2009 provides evidence on how regulatory interventions can influence consumer behavior and market outcomes, and how regulation can protect consumers, especially those with subprime credit. His work showed how the positive impact brought by the CARD Act, such as the reduction in overall borrowing costs, especially for consumers with lower credit scores, due to regulatory limits on credit card fees. The CARD Act is estimated to have saved consumers $11.9 billion per year.

Agarwal and a team of researchers have investigated the real-world impacts of mobile payment technologies, big data and machine learning. Their work explores how big data and machine learning are revolutionizing credit scoring, enabling greater financial access for previously underserved populations.

Additionally, his research on mobile payments and their impact on economic activities and business creation in Singapore demonstrates how technological advancements are reshaping small business growth and consumer behavior.

Agarwal's work on the Home Affordable Modification Program (HAMP) in "Policy Intervention in Debt Renegotiation: Evidence from the Home Affordable Modification Program" assesses the effectiveness of government interventions in mortgage modifications and their role in mitigating foreclosures during the housing crisis. Moreover, his study "Optimal Mortgage Refinancing: A Closed Form Solution" offers insights into the decision-making process behind mortgage refinancing.

Research such as "Mortgage Debt, Hand-to-Mouth Households, and Monetary Policy Transmission" investigates the impact of an unexpected interest rate decrease on credit card spending behavior in China. The study sheds light on how macroeconomic policies, like changes in interest rates, affect household consumption and debt decisions, particularly among those with limited liquidity.

Agarwal has examined the social and environmental impacts of financial practices. In "Disguised Pollution: Industrial Activities in the Dark," he investigates how firms may obscure their environmental impact, particularly in relation to air pollution in China. This research highlights the intersection of finance, regulation, and environmental policy, showcasing the broader implications of financial decisions on society and the environment.

== Awards and honors ==
- 1995 University of Wisconsin–Milwaukee - J. Walter Elliot Award for Excellence in Macroeconomics
- 2012 Red Rock Finance Conference, Best Paper Award
- 2016 National University of Singapore University Outstanding Researcher Award ($15,000)
- 2016 Society for Financial Studies - Review of Corporate Finance Studies, Best Paper Award ($10,000)
- 2017 University of Wisconsin–Milwaukee - Distinguished Alumni Achievement Award
- 2018 American Economic Review - Excellence in Refereeing Award 2017
- 2024-2022 Research.com - Economics and Finance in Singapore Leader Award

== Media appearances ==
- “Documentary clip: ‘The Collapse of Lehman Brothers – The $639 Billion Crash’ (YouTube) featuring Sumit Agarwal discussing the 2008 financial crisis and implications for global finance.”

== Selected publications ==
=== 2026 ===
- Agarwal, S., Zhang, J., & Zou, X. (2026). Household sustainability: Nurturing a greener, fairer, and more prosperous future. https://doi.org/10.1142/13936
- Agarwal, S., Wang, L., & Yang, Y. (2026). Online consumption and sustained air pollution exposure: Evidence from a quasi-experiment in China. Regional Science and Urban Economics, 121, 104267. https://doi.org/10.1016/j.regsciurbeco.2026.104267

=== 2025 ===
- Agarwal, S., Chua, Y. H., Ghosh, P., Ghosh, S. K., & She, L. (2025). Mortgages, subways and automobiles. Journal of Public Economics, 252, 105522. https://doi.org/10.1016/j.jpubeco.2025.105522
- Adbi, A., Agarwal, S., & Natarajan, S. (2025). Global heterogeneity in ETS rollouts and subsequent decarbonization outcomes. Energy Economics, 132, 108921. https://doi.org/10.1016/j.eneco.2025.108921
- Agarwal, S., Fan, M., & Qin, Y. (2025). Avoid urban development policy that fuels climate risk. Nature Climate Change. https://doi.org/10.1038/s41558-025-02365-3
- Agarwal, S., Ghosh, P., & Zhang, J. (2025). Tax policy transmission and household expenditures. The Review of Economics and Statistics. https://doi.org/10.1162/rest_a_01584
- Adbi, A., Agarwal, S., & Ghosh, P. (2025). Urban noise pollution and learning in developing economies. Nature Cities, 2, 6–7. https://doi.org/10.1038/s44284-024-00189-4
- Agarwal, S., Qin, Y., Sing, T. F., & Zhan, C. (2025). Sea level rise risks, adaptation strategies, and real estate prices in Singapore. Journal of Public Economics, 241, 105290. https://doi.org/10.1016/j.jpubeco.2024.105290

=== 2024 and older ===
- Agarwal, S.; Ghosh, P.; Zheng, H. (2024). "Consumption response to a natural disaster: Evidence of price and income shocks from Chennai flood". Energy Economics. 131 107323. doi:10.1016/j.eneco.2024.107323.
- Agarwal, S.; Ding, Y.H.; Kuang, W.D.; Zhu, X. (2023). "Are environmental punishments good news or bad news? Evidence from China". Journal of Environmental Economics and Management. 120 102847. doi:10.1016/j.jeem.2023.102847.
- Agarwal, S.; Han, Y.; Qin, Y.; Zhu, H. (2023). "Disguised pollution: industrial activities in the dark". Journal of Public Economics. 223 104904. doi:10.1016/j.jpubeco.2023.104904.
- Agarwal, S.; Tan, P.L.; Tan-Soo, J.S. (2023). "Long-term effects of air pollution on Singapore's national university admissions". Applied Economics Letters. 31 (13): 1178–1183. doi:10.1080/13504851.2023.2177586.
- Agarwal, S.; Araral, E.; Fan, M.; Yu, Q.; Zheng, H. (2023). "The effects of policy announcement, prices and subsidies on water consumption". Nature Water. 1 (2): 176–186. doi:10.1038/s44221-023-00028-1.
- Agarwal, S.; Sing, T.F.; Sultana, M. (2022). "Public media campaign and energy conservation: A natural experiment in Singapore". Energy Economics. 114 106281. doi:10.1016/j.eneco.2022.106281.
- Agarwal, S.; Araral, E.; Fan, M.; Yu, Q.; Zheng, H. (2022). "Water conservation through plumbing and nudging". Nature Human Behaviour. 6 (6): 858–867. doi:10.1038/s41562-022-01320-y. PMID 35361909.
- Agarwal, S.; Long, W.; Yang, Y. (2021). "Impact of transboundary air pollution on service quality and consumer satisfaction". Journal of Economic Behavior and Organization. 192: 357–380. doi:10.1016/j.jebo.2021.10.002.
- Agarwal, S.; Yu, Q.; Shi, L.; Wei, G.; Zhu, H. (2021). "Impact of temperature on morbidity: New evidence from China". Journal of Environmental Economics and Management. 109 102495. doi:10.1016/j.jeem.2021.102495.
- Agarwal, S.; Sing, T. F.; Yang, Y. (2020). "The impact of transboundary haze pollution on household utilities consumption". Energy Economics. 85 104591. doi:10.1016/j.eneco.2019.104591.
- Agarwal, S.; Deng, Y.; Li, T. (2019). "Environmental regulation as a double-edged sword for housing markets: Evidence from the NOx budget trading program". Journal of Environmental Economics and Management. 96: 286–309. doi:10.1016/j.jeem.2019.06.006.
- Agarwal, S.; Rengarajan, S.; Sing, T. F.; Yang, Y. (2017). "Nudges from school children and electricity conservation: Evidence from the "Project Carbon Zero" campaign in Singapore". Energy Economics. 61: 29–41. doi:10.1016/j.eneco.2016.10.014.
- Agarwal, S.; Wang, L.; Yang, Z. (2018). "Blessing in disguise? Environmental shocks and performance enhancement". Journal of Economic Behavior and Organization. doi:10.2139/ssrn.3218812.

Agarwal has published over 200 scholarly papers in economics and finance journals and 7 books, with his latest book entitled Household Sustainability: Nurturing a Greener, Fairer, and More Prosperous Future. The book develops household sustainability as a field encompassing environmental sustainability, social well-being and financial resilience.
