= Task 40 =

IEA Bioenergy Task 40: Sustainable International Bioenergy Trade, commonly abbreviated Task 40, was established under the International Energy Agency (IEA) Bioenergy Implementing Agreement in December 2003 with the aim of focusing on international bioenergy technology potential, barriers, and trade as well as its wider implications. Task 40 develops sustainable biomass markets, leading to a stable global commodity market in biomass energy.
