= Fatih Birol =

Turkish economist and energy expert

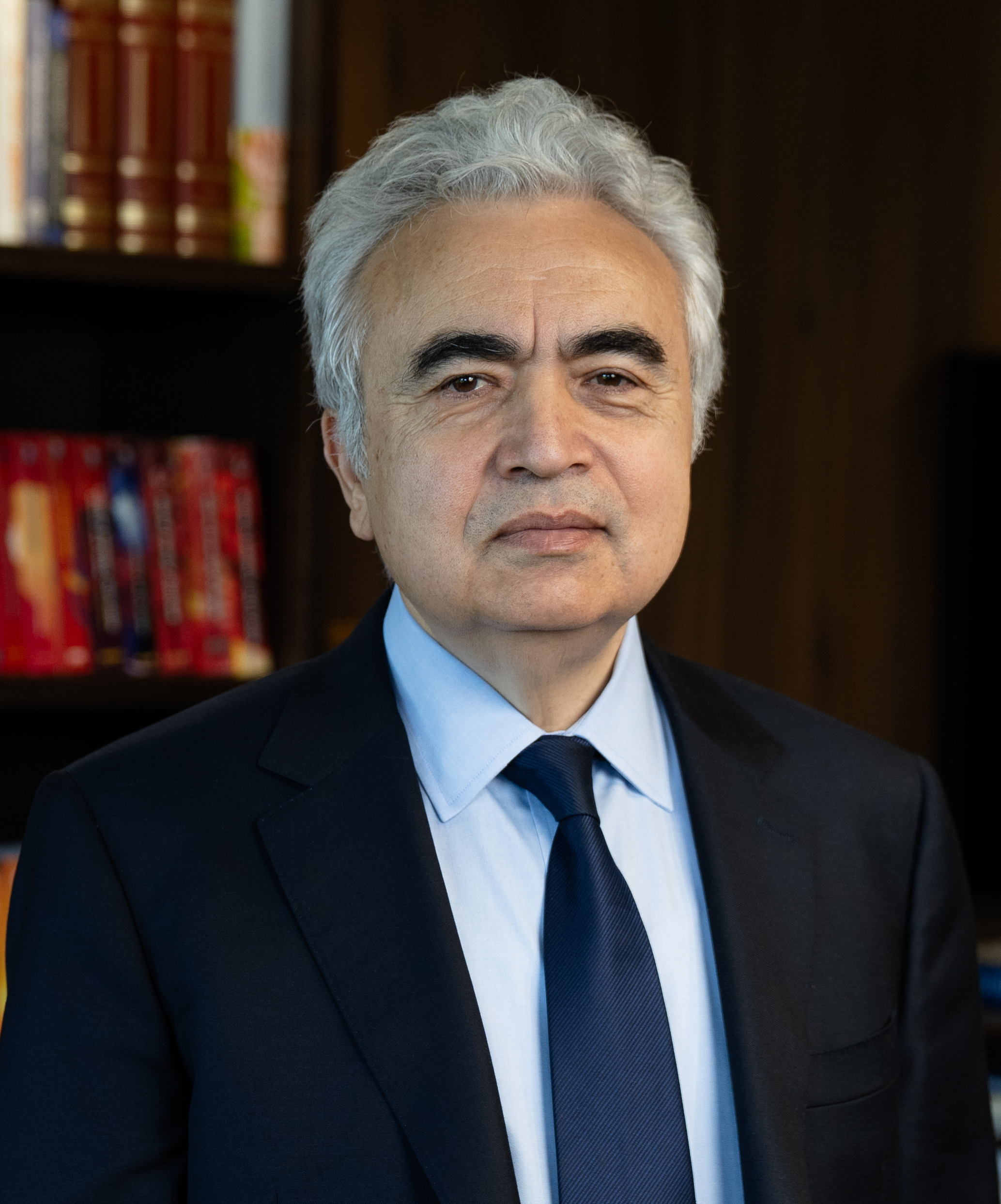
- Birol in 2025

Executive director of the International Energy Agency
- Incumbent
- Assumed office 1 September 2015
- Deputy: Mary Burce Warlick
- Preceded by: Maria van der Hoeven

Personal details
- Born: 22 March 1958 (age 68) Ankara, Turkey
- Education: Istanbul Technical University (BS); TU Wien (MS, PhD)

Fatih Birol (born 22 March 1958) is a Turkish economist and energy expert, who has served as the executive director of the Paris-based International Energy Agency (IEA) since 1 September 2015. During his time in charge of the IEA he has coordinated three emergency oil stock releases and taken a series of steps to modernise the Paris-based international organisation, including strengthening ties with emerging economies; broadening the Agency's energy security mandate to include electricity, natural gas, renewables and critical minerals; and stepping up work on the clean energy transition and international efforts to reach net zero emissions.

Birol was named on the Time 100 list of the world's most influential people in 2021 and again in 2026, has been named by Forbes magazine among the most influential people on the world's energy scene and recognised by the Financial Times in 2017 as Energy Personality of the Year. Birol is the chairman of the World Economic Forum (Davos) Energy Advisory Board. He is a frequent contributor to print and electronic media and delivers numerous speeches each year at major international summits and conferences.

Here is part of Time's tribute to Fatih Birol: "During the war in Iran, he has helped coordinate a collective release of strategic oil reserves to alleviate a moment of crisis. He has also expanded the IEA’s reach, deepening engagement with emerging economies. What sets Fatih apart is not only his commitment to facts and data, but his ability to anticipate new challenges while emphasizing the importance of abundant energy for development in the Global South and the need to address energy’s role in climate change. Energy sits at the intersection of prosperity, security, and sustainability. Navigating these competing demands requires trusted voices, leadership, and the ability to forge cooperation amid geopolitical tensions."

== Early life and education ==
A Turkish citizen, Birol was born in Ankara in 1958. He earned a B.Sc. in Power Engineering from the Istanbul Technical University. He received his M.Sc. and Ph.D. in Energy Economics from the Technical University of Vienna. In 2013, Birol was awarded a Doctorate of Science honoris causa by Imperial College London. In 2023, he was elected as a foreign member of the Chinese Academy of Engineering.

== Career ==
Prior to joining the IEA as a junior analyst in 1995, Birol worked at the Organization of the Petroleum Exporting Countries (OPEC) in Vienna. Over the years at the IEA, Birol worked his way up to the job of chief economist, a role in which he was in charge of the IEA's closely watched World Energy Outlook report, before he became executive director in 2015.

=== IEA leadership ===
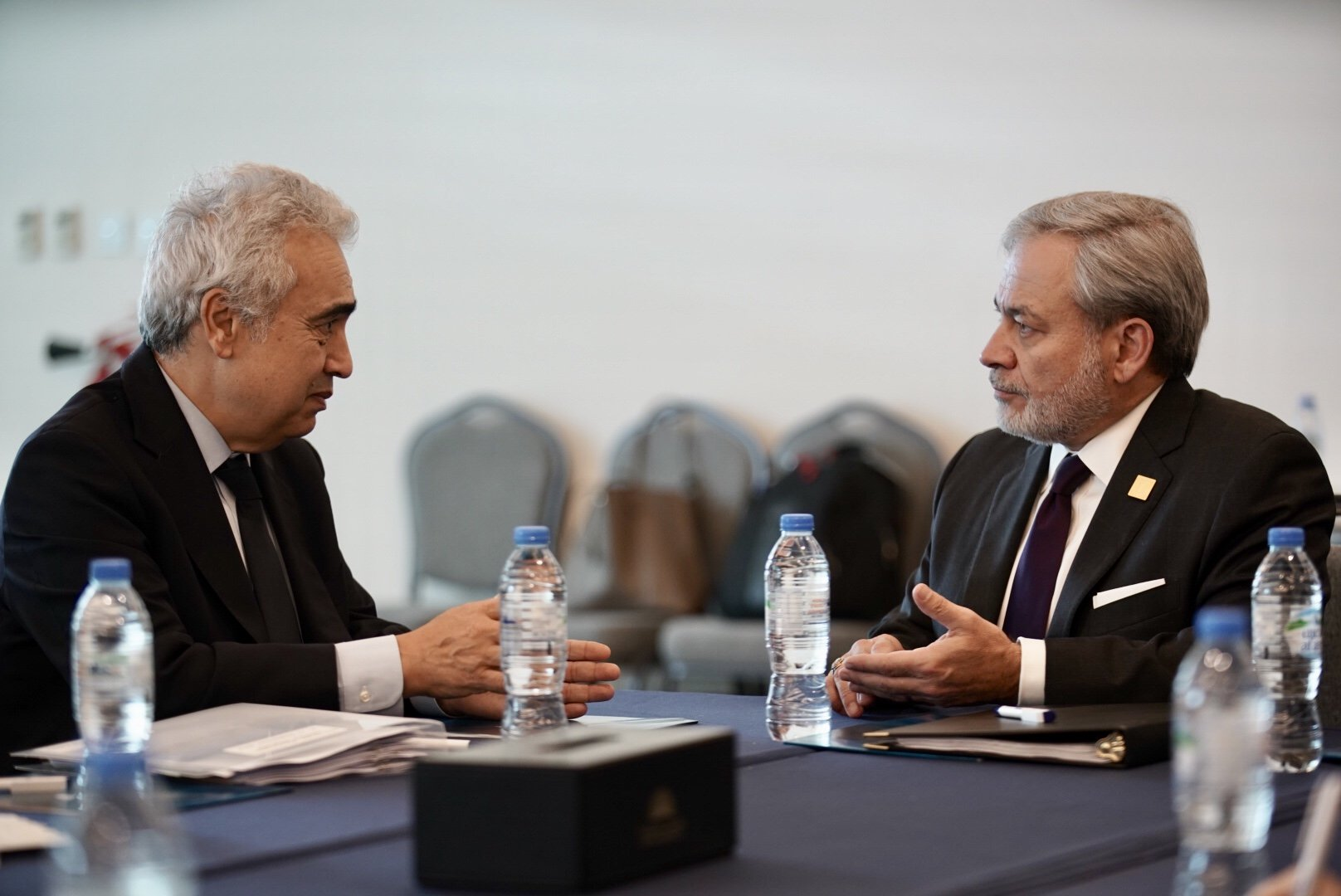
Trump administration energy secretary Dan Brouillette meeting with Birol at the 24th World Energy Conference meeting in 2019

While at the International Energy Agency, Birol has overseen several major changes in the approach of the organization. The organization, whose original mandate centred on oil security, has expanded its scope to also include the security of natural gas, electricity, renewables and critical minerals, and more members. Under his leadership, association agreements increased with major producers and consumers of energy, especially with countries outside the OECD in the Global South, such as India, Brazil, China, Kenya, Indonesia, South Africa and Viet Nam. This new membership model means that IEA member and Association countries represent over 80% of global energy consumption, up from around 40% when Birol took office. During his tenure, the IEA also opened its first office outside of its Paris headquarters, establishing a Regional Cooperation Centre in Singapore focused on Southeast Asia.

Birol's approach to running the organization involves both securing energy security and facilitating the energy transition. In 2021, he called on policymakers to do more to accelerate the clean energy transition and reduce emissions, saying that "Clean-energy technologies are slowly but surely going to replace the existing energy industry." This transition significantly changed the direction of the organization, which previously had focused almost entirely on fossil fuel market analysis.

Birol's influence on markets and the world energy community mainly derives from the data-rich reports produced by the IEA which The New York Times described as a "relentless spigot". His speeches and networking with world leaders at international meetings such as the World Economic Forum and United Nations Climate Change Conferences have also been influential.

His tenure has spanned two major energy crises. In 2022, he led the coordination of two emergency releases of oil reserves following Russia's invasion of Ukraine, and in March 2026 announced the biggest emergency release of oil in IEA history amid the disruptions to supplies through the Strait of Hormuz.

Birol has also been a prominent advocate for expanding access to electricity and clean cooking solutions in developing countries, particularly in Africa, including convening the IEA's 2024 Summit on Clean Cooking in Africa.

His work at the IEA has led to a number of his international honours and recognitions (see table below). He was on the Time 100 list of the world's most influential people in 2021 and in 2026, has been named by Forbes magazine among the most influential people on the world's energy scene, and recognised by the Financial Times in 2017 as Energy Personality of the Year.

=== Beyond IEA ===
Birol is part of the Africa Europe Foundation's (AEF) High-Level Group of Personalities on Africa-Europe Relations (since 2020). He is also an honorary life member of Galatasaray Football Club.

== Honours and medals ==
Ribbon bar	Award or decoration	Country	Date	Place	Note	Ref.
	Medal for Outstanding Service of Ministry of Foreign Affairs of Turkey	Turkey	1 October 2005	Ankara		
	Ordre des Palmes Académiques	France	1 October 2006	Paris		
	Decoration of Honour for Services to the Republic of Austria	Austria	1 March 2007	Vienna		
	First Class Order of Merit of the Federal Republic of Germany	Germany	19 November 2009	Berlin		
	Officer of the Order of Merit of the Italian Republic	Italy	14 June 2012	Paris		
	First Class Order of the Polar Star	Sweden	11 December 2013	Stockholm		
	First Class Order of the Rising Sun	Japan	30 January 2014	Paris		
	Melchett Medal	United Kingdom	2017			
	Chevalier of the Legion of Honour	France	6 December 2023	Paris	Chevalier (Knight) is the lowest class of the Légion d'honneur, which is the highest French order of merit.	
	Order of Zayed	United Arab Emirates	22 May 2024	Abu Dhabi		
	Order of Diplomatic Service Merit	South Korea	2 September 2024	Seoul	Grand Gwanghwa Medal	
	Grand Collar of the Order of Prince Henry	Portugal	29 September 2025	Lisbon	Conferred by President Marcelo Rebelo de Sousa; the Grand Collar is the order's highest class.	
	Grand Officer of the Order of Leopold	Belgium	1 October 2025	Brussels	Belgium's highest order of merit, conferred by King Philippe of Belgium.	
	Order of Friendship	Azerbaijan	13 March 2025	Baku		

Diplomatic posts
Preceded by Maria van der Hoeven	Executive Director of the International Energy Agency; 2015–present	Incumbent
