= Maria van der Hoeven =

Dutch politician (born 1949)

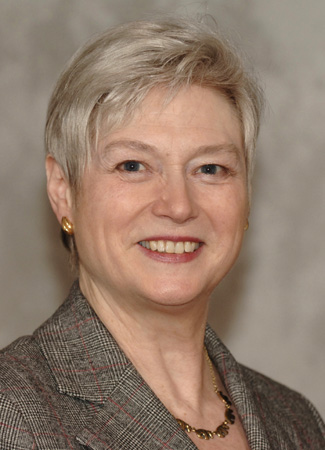
- Van der Hoeven in 2007

Executive Director of the International Energy Agency
- In office 1 September 2011 – 31 August 2015
- Deputy: Richard Jones
- Preceded by: Nobuo Tanaka
- Succeeded by: Fatih Birol

Minister of Economic Affairs
- In office 22 February 2007 – 14 October 2010
- Prime Minister: Jan Peter Balkenende
- Preceded by: Joop Wijn
- Succeeded by: Maxime Verhagen

Minister of Education, Culture and Science
- In office 22 July 2002 – 22 February 2007
- Prime Minister: Jan Peter Balkenende
- Preceded by: Loek Hermans
- Succeeded by: Ronald Plasterk

Member of the House of Representatives
- In office 30 November 2006 – 22 February 2007
- In office 30 January 2003 – 27 May 2003
- In office 11 June 1991 – 22 July 2002

Personal details
- Born: Maria Josephina Arnoldina van der Hoeven; 13 September 1949 (age 77) Meerssen, Netherlands
- Party: Christian Democratic Appeal (from 1980)
- Other political affiliations: Catholic People's Party (until 1980)
- Spouse: Lou Buytendijk (m. 1978; died 2012)
- Education: Open University (Bachelor of Education)
- Occupation: Politician · Civil servant · Corporate director · Nonprofit director · Education administrator · Teacher · Lobbyist

Maria Josephina Arnoldina van der Hoeven (born 13 September 1949) is a retired Dutch politician of the Christian Democratic Appeal (CDA) and nonprofit director.

Van der Hoeven attended a Lyceum in Maastricht from April 1966 until May 1969 and applied at the Open University in Heerlen in July 1970 majoring in Education obtaining a Bachelor of Education degree in June 1972. Van der Hoeven worked as a economics teacher in Maastricht from June 1969 until February 1987, and served as an education administrator for the Adult Commercial Vocational Training Centre in Maastricht from September 1981 until February 1987. Van der Hoeven served on the Municipal Council of Maastricht from April 1974 until June 1991. Van der Hoeven worked as Chairwoman of the Supervisory board of the Limburg Technology Centre from February 1987 until June 1991.

Van der Hoeven became a member of the House of Representatives after Huib Eversdijk was elected to the Senate in the 1991 Senate election, taking office on 11 June 1991, serving as a frontbencher chairing the parliamentary committee for Education, Culture and Science and spokesperson for education, social work and culture, and deputy spokesperson for the interior, economic affairs, social affairs, ombudsman and equality.

After the 2002 general election, Van der Hoeven was appointed as Minister of Education, Culture and Science in the Balkenende I cabinet, taking office on 22 July 2002. The cabinet fell just four months later on 16 October 2002 after tensions in the coalition over the stability of the Pim Fortuyn List (LPF) and continued to serve in a demissionary capacity. After the 2002 general election, Van der Hoeven returned to the House of Representatives, taking office on 30 January 2003. Following the cabinet formation of 2003 Van der Hoeven continued as Minister of Education, Culture and Science in the Balkenende II cabinet, taking office on 27 May 2003. This cabinet fell on 30 June 2006 after the Democrats 66 (D66) had lost confidence in the functioning of Minister of Integration and Asylum Affairs Rita Verdonk and continued to serve in a demissionary capacity until it was replaced by the caretaker Balkenende III cabinet with Van der Hoeven remaining as Minister of Education, Culture and Science, taking office on 7 July 2006. After the 2006 general election Van der Hoeven again returned to the House of Representatives, taking office on 30 November 2006. Following the cabinet formation of 2006 Van der Hoeven was appointed as Minister of Economic Affairs in the Balkenende IV cabinet, taking office on 22 February 2007. The Balkenende IV cabinet fell on 20 February 2010 after tensions in the coalition over the extension of the Dutch involvement in the Task Force Urozgan of the International Security Assistance Force (ISAF) in Afghanistan and continued to serve in a demissionary capacity. In May 2010 Van der Hoeven announced that she would not stand for the 2010 general election. Following the cabinet formation of 2010 Van der Hoeven was not given a cabinet post in the new cabinet. The Balkenende IV cabinet was replaced by the Rutte I cabinet on 14 October 2010.

== Biography ==
=== Early life ===
After completing her secondary education she trained as a primary school teacher in Maastricht. She went on to gain a secondary teaching certificate in English, after which she attended courses in higher management for non-profit organisations at the Institute of Social Sciences and business management at the Open University in Heerlen. From 1969 she taught at home economics schools and from 1971 at a junior secondary commercial school, where she later became a school counsellor. Until 1987 she was head of the Adult Commercial Vocational Training Centre in Maastricht, after which she served as the head of the Limburg Technology Centre until 1991.

=== Politics ===
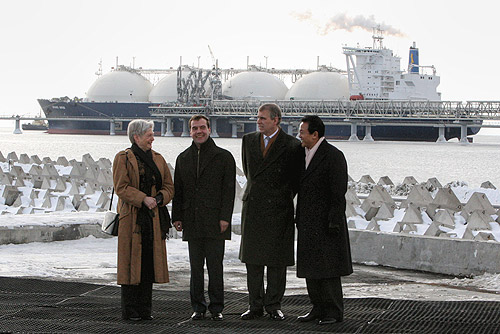
Yuzhno-Sakhalinsk, 2009. Van der Hoeven with incumbent Russian President Dmitry Medvedev, Japanese PM Taro Aso, and Prince Andrew.

From 1985 to 1991, Van der Hoeven was a member of the municipal council of Maastricht. From 1991 to 2002, Member of the House of Representatives and Minister of Education, Culture and Science from 2002 to 2007. In 2005, she caused an uproar in a debate about the teaching of Intelligent Design in the country's schools. Van der Hoeven said that Charles Darwin's theories were incomplete and that new things had been discovered by proponents of intelligent design. The then Dutch Minister of Education later announced that she did not intend to introduce the creationist ideas into the school curricula but only wanted to confront their adherents with the supporters of the theory of evolution.

Minister of Economic Affairs from 2007 to 2010, she has held a variety of social and cultural posts, including membership of the governing board of the Domstad Primary Teacher Training College in Utrecht and the Southern Dutch Opera Association, and membership of the ‘’t Vervolg’ theatre group.

On 11 March 2011, Van der Hoeven was appointed Executive Director of the International Energy Agency. Her opponents have voiced concerns that she lacks expertise on energy matters, while her supporters point out that her work as Minister of Economic Affairs included many energy issues, and that she has extensive contacts with major OPEC members. She took over from Nobuo Tanaka on 1 September 2011. On 1 September 2015, she was succeeded by Fatih Birol.

== Later career ==
Since October 2016, van der Hoeven has been Vice Chairwoman of the High-level Panel of the European Decarbonisation Pathways Initiative within the European Commission. In addition, she holds several board memberships.

=== Corporate boards ===
- Innogy, Member of the Supervisory Board (since 2016)
- TotalEnergies SE, Independent Member of the Board of Directors (since 2016)

=== Non-profit organizations ===
- Rocky Mountain Institute (RMI), Board de Trustees (since 2015)

== Personal life ==
Van der Hoeven was married to Lou Buytendijk, who was diagnosed with Alzheimer's disease in 2005 and succumbed to his illness in 2012. Because of her husband's illness she is active in the Dutch Alzheimer's Foundation and currently serves as its president.

== Decorations ==
Honours
Ribbon bar	Honour	Country	Date	Comment
	Officer of the Legion of Honour	France	28 October 2008	
	Officer of the Order of Orange-Nassau	Netherlands	3 December 2010	
	Officer of the Order of Saints Maurice and Lazarus	House of Savoy	4 November 2017	

== See also ==
- Creation and evolution in public education
- Politics of the Netherlands
- World Energy Outlook

Political offices
Preceded by Loek Hermans	Minister of Education, Culture and Science; 2002–2007	Succeeded by Ronald Plasterk
Preceded by Joop Wijn	Minister of Economic Affairs; 2007–2010	Succeeded by Maxime Verhagen
Diplomatic posts
Preceded by Nobuo Tanaka	Executive Director of the International Energy Agency; 2011–2015	Succeeded by Fatih Birol
Non-profit organization positions
Preceded by Ad Adriaansen	Chairwoman of the Supervisory board of the Dutch Alzheimer's Foundation; 2010–2013	Succeeded by Liesbeth Spies
