= Nobuo Tanaka =

Japanese official

- 田中 伸男
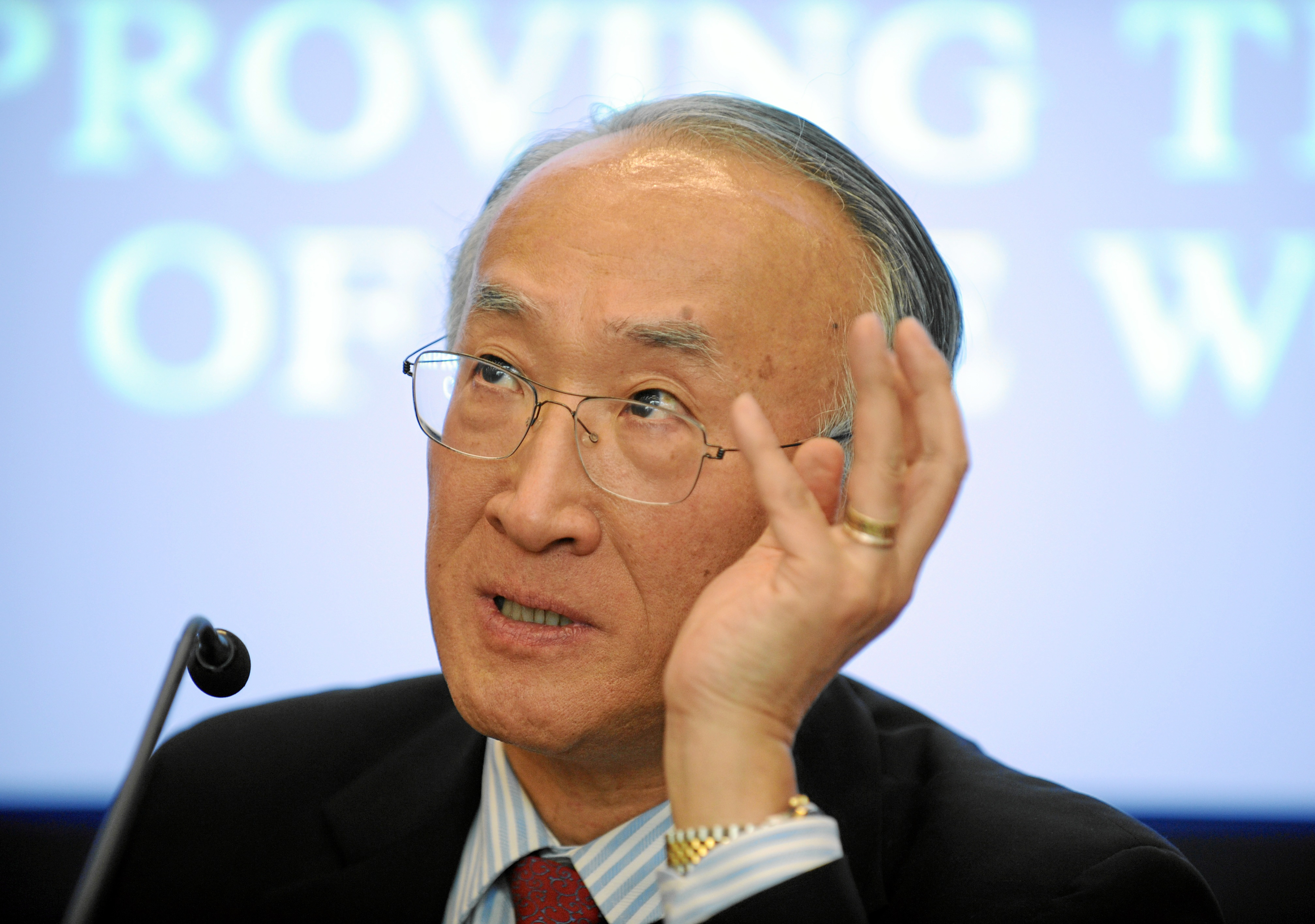
- Tanaka in 2011

Executive Director of the International Energy Agency
- In office 1 September 2007 – 1 September 2011
- Preceded by: Claude Mandil
- Succeeded by: Maria van der Hoeven

Personal details
- Born: 3 March 1950 (age 76)
- Party: Liberal Democratic Party
- Education: University of Tokyo; Case Western Reserve University

Nobuo Tanaka (田中 伸男, Tanaka Nobuo; born 3 March 1950) is a Japanese official and the former Executive Director of the International Energy Agency.

== Biography ==
He was born on 3 March 1950 in Japan. He graduated from the University of Tokyo in the field of economics in 1972, and has an MBA from Case Western Reserve University, Cleveland, Ohio (1979). In 1973 he began his career with the Ministry of Economy, Trade and Industry of Japan (METI). In 1989 he joined the Organisation for Economic Co-operation and Development (OECD) as the Deputy-Director for Science, Technology and Industry, and served in 1991–1995 as the Director for Science, Technology and Industry.

In 1995 he returned to METI where he served as Director for Industrial Finance Division and as Director for Policy Planning and Coordination Division. In 1998–2000 he was posted at the Embassy of Japan in Washington, D.C., as Minister for Energy, Trade and Industry. After returning to Japan in 2000 he took a post of the Executive Vice President for the Research Institute of Economy Trade and Industry, and in 2002–2004 the post of the Director-General for the Multilateral Trade System Department of METI.

From 16 August 2004 to 31 August 2007 Nobuo Tanaka was the Director for Science, Technology and Industry at the OECD, and head of the internal OECD Steering Group for the Centre for Entrepreneurship. On 1 September 2007 he succeeded Claude Mandil as the Executive Director of the IEA. On 1 September 2011, he was succeeded in this role by the Former Minister of Economic Affairs of the Netherlands, Maria van der Hoeven.

Since September 2011 he is Global Associate for Energy Security and Sustainability at the Institute for Energy Economics, Japan ("Eneken") in Tokyo. He is also a professor at the Graduate School of Public Policy, University of Tokyo. He is also a fellow at the Center on Global Energy Policy at Columbia University in New York where he has given lectures on subjects like Post Fukushima energy policy, the Shale revolution and energy security, China energy and sustainability, and the Integral Fast Reactor during frequent weekly visits to the Columbia Morningside campus each academic semester. He is a vocal advocate for advanced nuclear energy for Japan and international cooperation between Japan and the Republic of Korea to build the first commercial Integral Fast Reactor in the world. On May 28, 2014 he hosted the Global Leader Program for Social Design and Management (GSDM) 15th Platform Seminar, The 79th Public Policy Seminar at the University of Tokyo (title: "Peaceful and Safer Use of Nuclear Power: Role of Integral Fast Reactor"). His research paper on the role of the Integral Fast Reactor was published in January 2017.

Nobuo Tanaka is married and has two children.

Diplomatic posts
Preceded by Claude Mandil	Executive Director of the International Energy Agency; 2007–2011	Succeeded by Maria van der Hoeven
