= Energy Carta =

Organization

- Founded: 2007
- Registration no.: T08SS0145F
- Purpose: Clean energy, sustainable development
- Location: Singapore
- Region served: Asia Pacific
- Method: Events, focus group discussions, information portals, initiatives
- Employees: 30
- Website: http://www.energycarta.org/

Energy Carta is a non-profit organization founded in Singapore by a team of young adults.

It promotes its cause by bringing stakeholders together to have discourse and provide solutions to the climate change issues the world faces. In particular, it seeks to promote interest amongst the grassroots and students

It was awarded the Special Mention Award of the 2013 Singapore Energy Award.

== Objectives ==
=== Educate ===
- To raise grassroots awareness, particularly amongst students, towards clean technology and the opportunities available in this emerging industry.
- Highlight to the future leaders of the world the importance of economics, technology and policies in resolving climate change issues.
- Raising environmental awareness towards global warming and climate change.

=== Engage all stakeholders ===
- Stakeholders include policymakers in government, non-governmental organizations, institutes, engineers, entrepreneurs, corporate leaders, academics, and student activists.
- To engage these stakeholders to allow for discourse and creation of economic opportunities.
- Be the interface between the student population and the industry; realizing and publicizing the opportunities including jobs, internships, research projects, creation of startups etc.

=== Focus on Asia ===
- Highlight the economic potential, environmental urgency and possibilities within Asia, particularly favorable policies, emerging markets and technology.

== Team ==
Energy Carta comprises over 30 student members with international and leadership experiences, with members from parts of the world such as China, India, Malaysia, Bangladesh, Singapore and Kenya. Some of the team has spent time working internationally in industry and studying in universities across the United States, Europe, China and Singapore, including Stanford University, Wharton School of the University of Pennsylvania, Fudan University, the Royal Institute of Technology (KTH) Sweden KTH and the National University of Singapore (NUS). Many of them have led teams to organize international conferences and competitions including Harvard Project for Asian and International Relations, Start-Up@Singapore and BioBiz.

== Events ==
Energy Carta events include:

- Organizing an annual flagship conference on energy related issues, the first of which was a regional student conference in Oct 2008 focused on clean energy, targeting 200-300 students.
- Smaller scale events such as panel sessions, lecture series, round table discussions and job fairs organized on a monthly basis for an audience of 50-100 students.
- Collaborating with university departments, institutes and companies in pursuing hands-on activities pertaining to technology, policy and market research.
- Sourcing for internship, job opportunities, commercial, research and technical projects for its members to engage in.
- Embarking on energy efficiency initiatives within the school campus.
