= Claude Mandil =

French businessman (born 1942)

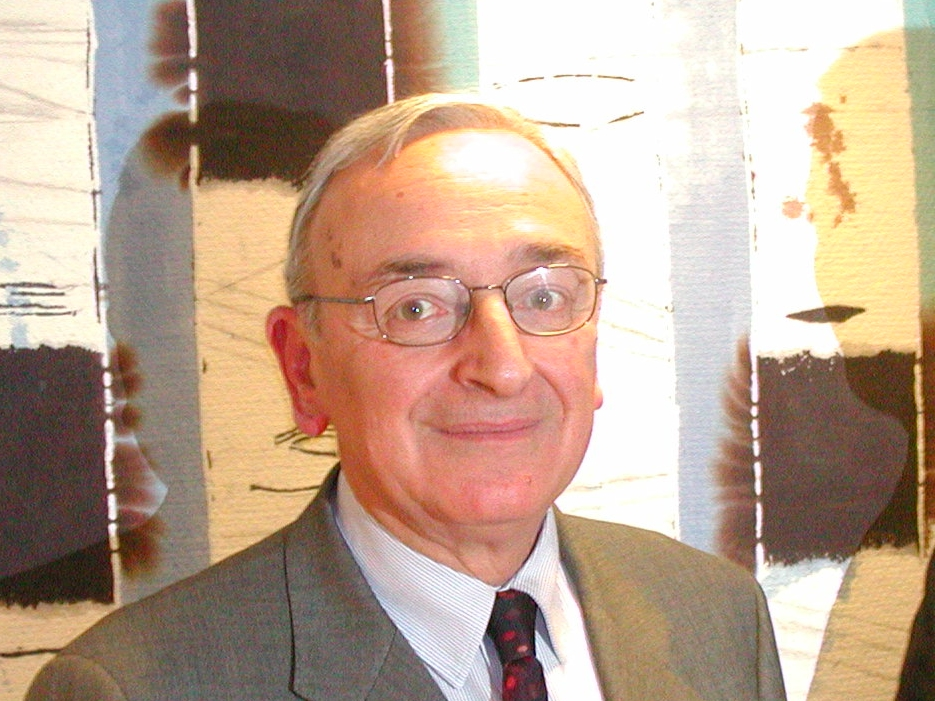
- Claude Mandil
- Born: 1942 (age 83–84); Lyon, France
- Education: Graduate
- Alma mater: École polytechnique École des Mines
- Occupation: Businessman
- Children: 5

Claude Mandil (born 1942 in Lyon, France) is a French businessman. Mandil is a member of the Board of Directors of Total S.A. and is the former executive director of the International Energy Agency (IEA).

== Education ==
Mandil graduated from France's École polytechnique and École des Mines. From 1967 until 1981, he held various positions with the French Civil Services related to engineering and territorial planning.

== Career ==
In 1981–1982, he served as a technical advisor in the French Prime Minister's cabinet, responsible for industry, energy and research. In 1982 he was named chief executive officer of the Institut de Développement Industriel (Institute for Industrial Development). In 1988 he became the director general of the Bureau de Recherches Géologiques et Minières (Geological and Mining Research Bureau).

From 1990 to 1998, Mandil served as director general for energy and raw materials at the Ministry of Industry, Post and Telecommunications. From 1991 to 1998, he also represented France at the Nuclear Safety Working Group of the G7 and served as the president of this group in 1996. From 1997 to 1998 he served as chairman of the IEA's governing board.

From 1998 to 2000, Mandil occupied the post of the managing director of Gaz de France, and then for several years was the chairman and CEO of the Institut Français du Pétrole (French Institute of Petroleum). From 2003 to 2007 he was the executive director of the International Energy Agency. Since 2008, is a member of the board of directors of Total S.A. Mandil was also a board member of the SBC Energy Institute and is director of Institut Veolia Environnement.

He is the author of a report on energy security, which was commissioned by the French Presidency of the Council of the European Union in 2008. In 2008, Mandil said that Europe must end its energy dependence on Russia. He said that "We need more energy efficiency, more liquefied natural gas, more renewable energy, more nuclear energy".

== Personal life ==
Mandil is married and has five children.
