= International Energy Agency =

Autonomous intergovernmental organisation

- Member countries Accession countries Association countries
- Abbreviation: IEA
- Established: 18 November 1974; 51 years ago
- Type: Autonomous intergovernmental organisation
- Headquarters: 9, rue de la Fédération, Paris, France
- Members: 32 member countries: Australia; Austria; Belgium; Canada; Czech Republic; Denmark; Estonia; Finland; France; Germany; Greece; Hungary; Ireland; Italy; Japan; Latvia; Lithuania; Luxembourg; Mexico; Netherlands; New Zealand; Norway; Poland; Portugal; Slovakia; South Korea; Spain; Sweden; Switzerland; Turkey; United Kingdom; United States
- Official languages: English
- Executive Director: Fatih Birol
- Deputy Executive Director: Mary Burce Warlick
- Budget: €61.8m (2022)
- Website: www.iea.org

The International Energy Agency (IEA) is a Paris-based autonomous intergovernmental organization, established in 1974, that provides policy recommendations, analysis and data on the global energy sector. The 32 member countries and 13 association countries of the IEA represent 75% of global energy demand.

The IEA was set up under the framework of the Organisation for Economic Co-operation and Development (OECD) in the aftermath of the 1973 oil crisis to respond to physical disruptions in global oil supplies, provide data and statistics about the global oil market and energy sector, promote energy savings and conservation, and establish international technical collaboration. Since its founding, the IEA has also coordinated use of the oil reserves that its members are required to hold.

In subsequent decades, the IEA's role expanded to cover the entire global energy system, encompassing traditional fuels such as gas, and coal as well as cleaner and fast-growing energy sources and technologies including renewable energy sources; solar photovoltaics, wind power, biofuels as well as nuclear power, and hydrogen, and the critical minerals needed for these technologies.

The core activity of the IEA is providing policy advice to its member states and Associated countries to support their energy security and advance their transition to clean energy. Recently, it has focused in particular on supporting global efforts to accelerate clean energy transition, mitigate climate change, reach net zero emissions, and prevent global temperatures from rising above 1.5 °C. All IEA member countries have signed the Paris Agreement which aims to limit warming to 1.5 °C, and two thirds of IEA member governments have made commitments to emission neutrality by 2050. (The United States has withdrawn twice.)

The Embassy of Australia, Paris, where the IEA headquarters are located

The IEA's executive director is Fatih Birol, who took office in late 2015. IEA publishes a range of reports and other information including its flagship publication, the annual World Energy Outlook, as well as the Net Zero by 2050 report.

== History ==
Two months after a 7,000-word preliminary draft agreement that notably did not include France, the IEA was founded on November 18, 1974, after the 1973 oil crisis, to avoid future shocks by helping to ensure reliable energy supplies, promote energy efficiency, ensure energy security and encourage technological research and innovation.

The Agreement on an International Energy Program (IEP Agreement) established the mandates and structure of the IEA, chartering it as an autonomous organisation under the umbrella of the Organisation for Economic Co-operation and Development (OECD). In 1996, the IEA relocated its headquarters from the Château de la Muette, which it shared with the OECD, to commercially leased space located within the Embassy of Australia, Paris.

The IEA operates autonomously, with its own budget and governance structure. The organization began with 16 founding member countries and has since expanded to 31, with the latest addition being Lithuania in 2022. Full members of the IEA must also be members of the OECD and are required to hold 90 days worth of oil imports as emergency stocks. These emergency stocks can be released to stabilize oil markets worldwide and have been activated six times: January 1991 due to the Gulf War, 2005 after devastation in the Gulf of Mexico from hurricanes Katrina and Rita, 2011 during the Libyan crisis, twice in 2022 in response to the Russian invasion of Ukraine, and in response to the 2026 Iran war. The emergency stocks release announced in 2026 was the largest in the IEA's history, totalling 400 million barrels.

In addition to the emergency release mechanism, the IEA's initial mandates include reducing dependence on oil, developing alternative energy sources, energy research and development, and collaboration with oil-producing companies and countries to create a stable energy market. Members are expected to draw up plans on demand reduction and efficiency measures that can be implemented during energy emergencies.

In September 2015, the IEA's chief economist Fatih Birol was appointed executive director, the first time an official from within the organization was picked to lead it. They have a mandate to modernize the agency on three major pillars: broadening the IEA's mandate on energy security beyond oil to include natural gas and electricity; increasing engagement in emerging economies through new Association partnerships; and expanding the IEA's core focus on clean energy technology and energy efficiency. That December, the Paris Agreement was adopted at the United Nations Climate Change Conference (COP21) and the Agency transitioned into direct advocacy for the shipping industry to adopt greener alternatives to hydrocarbon fuels.

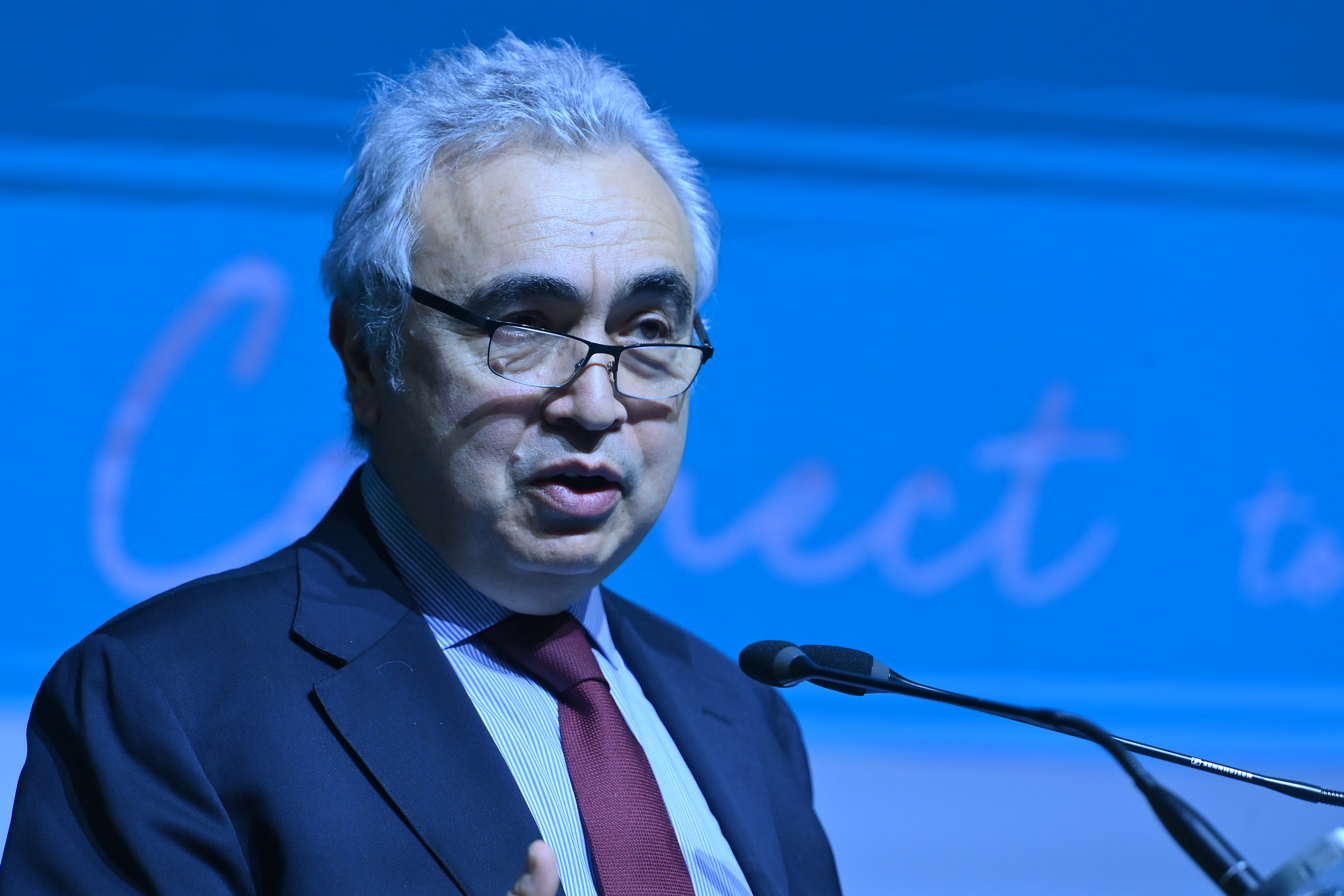
IEA chief Fatih Birol called on policymakers to do more to speed up the energy transition and reduce emissions.

The new category of "Association countries" was created in 2015, allowing countries that do not fit the criteria for IEA membership to become affiliated with the organization and participate in its work. China, Indonesia, and Thailand were the first to join and the IEA now has thirteen Association countries, including Ukraine since July 2022. IEA member and Association countries represent over 75% of global energy consumption.

In 2021, IEA chief Birol called on policymakers to do more to accelerate the clean energy transition and reduce emissions, saying that "Clean-energy technologies are slowly but surely going to replace the existing energy industry." The following year, Birole was appointed to an unprecedented third four-year leadership term.

After the IEA's 2022 Ministerial meeting, a bi-annual high-level meeting of IEA countries, member countries once again expanded the organisation's mandate to include accelerating the global clean energy transition by "supporting countries in the global effort to attain net zero greenhouse gas emissions in the energy sector by mid-century." The "IEA 3.0" mandate also doubles down on strengthening energy security and recognizes the importance of tracking critical minerals and materials to the clean energy transition.

== Leadership ==
Executive Directors of the International Energy Agency
No.	Name	Country of origin	Took office	Left office	Previous position	Ref.
1	Ulf Lantzke	Germany	1975	31 March 1984	Special Advisor on Energy Issues to the Secretary General of the Organisation for Economic Co-operation and Development (OECD)	
2	Helga Steeg	Germany	1 July 1984	30 September 1994	Director-General for Trade, Federal Ministry of Finance of the Federal Republic of Germany	
3	Robert Priddle	United Kingdom	1 December 1994	31 December 2002	Head of Consumer and Corporate Affairs, UK Department of Energy and Trade and Industry	
4	Claude Mandil	France	1 February 2003	31 August 2007	Chairman and CEO of the Institut français du pétrole, 2000–2003	
5	Nobuo Tanaka	Japan	1 September 2007	31 August 2011	Director for Science, Technology and Industry at the OECD, 1992–2007	
6	Maria van der Hoeven	Netherlands	1 September 2011	31 August 2015	Minister of Economic Affairs of the Netherlands, 2007–2010	
7	Fatih Birol	Turkey	1 September 2015	Incumbent	Chief Economist, International Energy Agency	

== Structure ==
The IEA's structure includes a Governing Board, Ministerial Meetings, and Standing Groups and Committees.

The Governing Board constitutes the main decision-making body of the organisation. It is composed of member country representatives and meets three to four times a year. The Governing Board is responsible for the IEA's administrative proceedings and approving binding decisions in relation to energy developments.

The IEA Ministerial Meeting is the biennial gathering of energy ministers who determine the broad direction of the IEA. The Ministerial allows for the development of ideas which are subsequently put to the Governing Board.

Standing Groups meet multiple times a year and are made up of officials from member states. The IEA has several Standing Groups and Committees, focusing on energy research and technology, long-term cooperation, emergency preparedness, and other topics.

== Membership ==
The 32 member countries and 13 association countries of the IEA represent 75% of global energy demand.

=== Member countries ===
Only OECD member states may join the IEA. Members are required to maintain total oil stock levels equivalent to at least 90 days of the previous year's net imports. Member countries commit to respond to significant oil disruptions through a collective action to allow more crude oil to enter the global market.

Country	Membership	Notes
Australia	1979	
Austria	18 November 1974	Founding member
Belgium	18 November 1974	Founding member
Canada	18 November 1974	Founding member
Czech Republic	5 February 2001	
Denmark	18 November 1974	Founding member
Estonia	9 May 2014	
Finland	1992	
France	1992	
Germany	18 November 1974	Founding member
Greece	1976	
Hungary	3 June 1997	
Ireland	18 November 1974	Founding member
Italy	18 November 1974	Founding member
Japan	18 November 1974	Founding member
Latvia	2024	
Lithuania	2022	
Luxembourg	18 November 1974	Founding member
Mexico	2018	
Netherlands	18 November 1974	Founding member
New Zealand	1977	
Norway	18 November 1974	Founding member (under a special Agreement)
Portugal	1981	
Poland	25 September 2008	
Slovakia	30 November 2007	
South Korea	20 April 2001	
Spain	18 November 1974	Founding member
Sweden	18 November 1974	Founding member
Switzerland	18 November 1974	Founding member
Turkey	18 November 1974	Founding member
United Kingdom	18 November 1974	Founding member
United States	18 November 1974	Founding member

=== Accession countries ===
Accession countries are those going through the process of becoming full members. The process involves authorisation by the Governing Board, discussions with the executive director, and the sharing of information related to the criteria for membership with the Secretariat.

The following countries are undergoing the accession process:

- Colombia
- Brazil
- Chile
- Costa Rica
- Israel
- Romania

=== Association countries ===
Association was formally launched in 2015 with a 13 country membership. The IEA collaborates with Association countries on a wide range of energy-related issues determined through joint programmes of work. Association countries may also participate in most Standing Groups and Ministerial meetings. India officially declared its "Association" status with the International Energy Agency (IEA) on March 30, 2017. Egypt and Argentina joined as Association countries in March 2022, and Ukraine was formally invited on 16 June 2022, and joined in July 2022.In July 2025, Brazil started the process to become a member country.

As of October 2026 the IEA has 14 association countries:

- Argentina
- China
- Egypt
- India
- Indonesia
- Kenya
- Morocco
- Nigeria
- Senegal
- Singapore
- South Africa
- Thailand
- Ukraine
- Vietnam

== Areas of work ==
The IEA produces analyses on all energy sources and technologies, on global and regional markets, as well as specific country-level reports and studies on key technologies, minerals, and materials for the clean energy transition. It also produces comprehensive data and statistics for over 150 countries.

The IEA's analytical work is split into various categories including policy recommendations, tracking, market forecasts, technical roadmapping, and scenario analysis.

=== Data ===
The IEA publishes comprehensive data, statistics, and analysis that inform national energy policies and support long-term planning for energy sector investments. The IEA analyses and releases data and information on trends in energy supply, demand, prices, public research and development, and energy efficiency metrics. The data also serves to track short- and long-term trends in countries energy transitions.

The Policies and Measures Database (PAMS) makes available to the public data on government policies and programs to reduce carbon emissions, support energy efficiency, and improve the development and use of renewable and clean energy sources. The database compiles data from several IEA and International Renewable Energy Agency (IRENA) data sources dating back to 1999 and includes information on past, current, and planned policy measures.

=== Scenarios ===
IEA publications give projections based on sets of assumptions called scenarios, with criteria that includes:

- Stated Policies Scenario (STEPS): Assumes implementation of governments' existing policies and firm commitments to reduce greenhouse gas emissions.
- Announced Pledges Scenario (APS): Assumes implementation of policies as in the STEPS, and also assumes fulfillment of looser pledges that are not yet backed by policy and legislation.
- Net Zero Scenario (NZE): Assumes implementation of the IEA's pathway to net zero emissions by 2050 while minimising cost and meeting key UN Sustainable Development Goals.

Older scenarios include:

- 450 Scenario: Environmental groups have become critical of the IEA's 450 Scenario (created to align with the 2009 Copenhagen Accord), contending it does not align with up-to-date climate science, nor is it consistent with the Paris climate agreement that aspires to limit global warming to 1.5 degrees Celsius. In March 2017, the IEA (along with IRENA) published a report that considers a safer climate scenario than the then-current 450S. This scenario offers improved chances of limiting global warming to less than two degrees, but – according to research organization Oil Change International – still falls short of adequately addressing climate science and the decarbonization required to reach agreed upon global climate limits. The IEA has stopped updating this safer climate scenario
- Sustainable Development Scenario: Concerns regarding the IEA's Sustainable Development Scenario (the successor to the 450 scenario) has also been raised by climate scientists and key financial institutions, who have called for 1.5°C scenario placed centrally in the World Energy Outlook. The IEA's Sustainable Development Scenario only gets to net-zero by 2070, two decades too late.

=== Key publications ===
World Energy Outlook (WEO)

The annual World Energy Outlook (WEO) is the International Energy Agency's (IEA) flagship publication on global energy projections and analysis. It contains medium to long-term energy market projections, extensive statistics, analysis and advice for both governments and the energy business regarding energy security, environmental protection and economic development. The first WEO was published in 1977 and it has been an annual publication since 1998.

The World Energy Outlook uses three scenarios to examine future energy trends. The Net Zero Emissions by 2050 Scenario is normative, in that it is designed to achieve specific outcomes – an emissions trajectory consistent with keeping the temperature rise in 2100 below 1.5 °C (with a 50% probability), universal access to modern energy services and major improvements in air quality – and shows a pathway to reach it. The Announced Pledges Scenario, and the Stated Policies Scenario are exploratory, in that they define a set of starting conditions, such as policies and targets, and then see where they lead based on model representations of energy systems, including market dynamics and technological progress. The scenarios are not predictions but enable policy-makers and other readers to compare different possible versions of the future and the levers and actions that produce them, with the aim of stimulating insights about the future of global energy.

A 2022 report on renewable energy

Net Zero by 2050: a roadmap for the global energy sector

Net Zero by 2050 was published in May 2021 and presented the first comprehensive pathway for the global energy sector to reach net zero emissions by 2050. The report introduced the Net Zero Emissions scenario, showing how to transition to net zero by 2050 while maintaining secure and affordable energy supplies, extending energy access, and encouraging robust economic growth. The report was the basis for a game created by the IEA and the Financial Times in which players compete to see if they can reduce emissions to net zero.

Energy Technology Perspectives (ETP)

First issued in 2006, ETP is a bi-annual guidebook on clean energy technology. The publication focuses on challenges, growth areas, and strengths of emerging clean energy technologies and their contribution to global energy and environmental policy-making.

Global EV Outlook (GEVO)

Published annually with the support of the members of the Electric Vehicles Initiative, GEVO highlights and analyses recent developments in EVs and electric mobility. The publication combines historical analysis with projections to 2030 for topics such as charging infrastructure, CO_{2} emissions, energy use, and related policy developments. The report includes policy recommendations to advance EV adoption.

Oil Market Report

First published in 1983, the monthly Oil Market Report analyses the global oil market, providing data and forecasts aimed for an audience of industry, financial, and government officials as well as an academic and NGO audience. Country specific analysis on trade and production tracks both OECD and non-OECD states.

Electricity Market Report

The Electricity Market Report provides regular forecasts for global electricity demand, supply, generation and emissions, with a special focus on recent developments.

Gas Market Report

The Gas Market Report is updated quarterly, providing the latest developments and data for global gas markets.

Energy Efficiency

Energy Efficiency is an annual report on global progress and developments in the crucial role that efficient appliances, equipment, buildings, transport and industry play in reducing energy use and the resulting emissions.

Renewable Energy Market Update

The Renewable Energy Market Update surveys new additions in global renewable power capacity and demand for biofuel. The report, which is updated several times a year, also discusses important variables and policy implications that may affect projections for the years to come.

World Energy Investment

The annual World Energy Investment tracks investment across the energy world, examining how investors are assessing risks and opportunities across all areas of fuel and electricity supply, critical minerals, efficiency and research and development.

Tracking Clean Energy Progress

TCEP reports on the status of 46 critical energy technologies and sectors needed to achieve net zero emissions by mid-century, and provides recommendations on how to accelerate their development and deployment.

Country Reviews

Since 1976, the IEA has published in-depth energy policy reviews. These country policy reviews are typically conducted every five years for member countries, and cover the full range of the country's energy systems and policies, with recent reports placing particular focus on progress towards reaching climate goals. The most recent reports were on Norway, Poland, Belgium, and Canada. The IEA also produces in-depth energy reviews of its accession and association countries, as well as partner countries.

=== Energy Efficiency ===
In its focus on energy efficiency, the IEA convenes policy leaders and other stakeholders with an eye toward scaling up progress on energy efficiency as a way to mitigate climate change, contribute to energy security, and deliver economic, and support economies and communities. The IEA has created Energy Efficiency Indicators based on over ten years of data to highlight the drivers of individual nations' energy use in order to track energy efficiency and improve national policies. The data covers major sectors such as residential services, industry, and transport.

=== Clean Energy Transitions Programme ===
CETP's focus is to "accelerate global clean energy transitions, particularly in major emerging economies." The program supports governments whose energy policies will be key to the global energy transition and involves collaborative analytics, technology cooperation, stakeholder convenings, and training and capacity-building. CETP has identified Brazil, China, India, Indonesia, Mexico, and South Africa as priority countries as well as the regions of Southeast Asia, Latin America and Africa.

=== People-Centered Clean Energy Transition ===
As part of its work on the energy transition, the IEA convenes the Global Commission for People-Centred Clean Energy Transitions to "ensure the benefits and costs involved in the transformation of our energy system are distributed fairly and in a way that protects the most vulnerable in society." The approach focuses on skill development, jobs, worker protections, economic development, equity and fairness, social inclusion, and engaging individuals as stakeholders in the process. The commission is composed of national leaders, government ministers, and representatives from civil society. In October 2021, the Commission published a report for twelve recommendations for a people-centered approach to the clean energy transition.

=== Resilience of the Energy Sector to Climate Change Impacts ===
Given the implications of climate change impacts for energy security, the IEA also works to understand climate impacts on energy systems and provide guidance on measures to improve their resilience to these impacts. This includes an assessment of hydropower under different climate scenarios and a report focused on climate hazards for power systems and measures to enhance their climate resilience. The IEA also provides an overview of the level of climate hazards in its member countries, along with key planning and policy documents to address energy sector climate resilience.

=== Technology Collaboration Programs (TCPs) ===
TCPs provide support to independent, international groups of government and industry experts to research, develop, and commercialise energy technologies and related issues: IEA list of TCPs. Over 6,000 experts are involved in TCPs across approximately 300 organisations in 55 countries. Examples of TCPs include the Energy in Buildings and Communities (EBC), Photovoltaic Power Systems (PVPS), and Hybrid and Electric Vehicles (HEV) and SolarPACES TCP

== Activity ==
In March 2026, International Energy Agency facilitated the release of a record amount of 400 million barrels of oil to tackle fall in supply caused by the US-Israel war with Iran. This oil comes form the emergency reserves of member countries including the UK and the US.

== Criticism ==
=== Bias against renewable energy ===
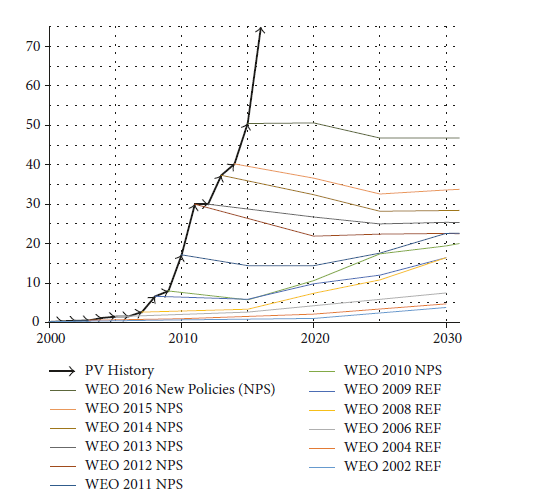
Real development of global photovoltaics additions (in gigawatt) vs. predictions by the IEA, 2002–2016

The IEA has been criticised for systematically underestimating the role of renewable energy sources in future energy systems such as photovoltaics and their cost reductions.

In the past, the IEA has been criticized by environmental groups for underplaying the role of renewable energy technologies in favor of nuclear and fossil fuels. In 2009, Guy Pearse stated that the IEA has consistently underestimated the potential for renewable energy alternatives.

The Energy Watch Group (EWG), a coalition of scientists and politicians which analyses official energy industry predictions, claims that the IEA has had an institutional bias towards traditional energy sources and has been using "misleading data" to undermine the case for renewable energy, such as wind and solar. A 2008 EWG report compares IEA projections about the growth of wind power capacity and finds that it has consistently underestimated the amount of energy the wind power industry can deliver.

For example, in 1998, the IEA predicted global wind electricity generation would total 47.4 GW by 2020, but EWG's report states that this level was reached by the end of 2004. The report also said that the IEA has not learned the lesson of previous underestimates, and in 2008, net additions of wind power globally were four times greater than the average IEA estimate from its 1995–2004 predictions. This pattern seems to have continued through 2016.

In a press release, the IEA stated that '80% of the increase in global electricity generation in 2024 was provided by renewable sources and nuclear', placing nuclear power production alongside renewable energy sources as if both were being expanded on a grand scale. While it announced that renewables were expanded by 700 GW, it concealed the fact that nuclear power capacity was not even expanded by a hundredth of this, namely 6.84 GW. In the document announced with the press release, it states the increase in nuclear power capacity at 7 GW, but conceals the fact that, according to its own figures, 2.89 GW were lost in the same year due to the shutdown of nuclear power plants.

Amid discontent from across the renewables sector at the IEA's performance as a global energy watchdog, the International Renewable Energy Agency was formed on January 26, 2009. The aim is to have the agency fully operational by 2010 with an initial annual budget of €25M.

The IEA forecasts for solar power during the 2010s were criticized as not in accordance with the exponential growth in the sector. Authors Adam Whitmore of Harvard's Belfer Center for Science and International Affairs and Terje Osmundsen, then the senior vice president of Scatec Solar, a Norwegian solar power company, claimed that the agency's cost assumptions were 100% above current market prices, creating misleading projections that perpetuate the impression that the growth of solar power requires huge subsidies, which has the potential to discourage investment in solar energy market and, consequently, stymie faster growth.

=== Accuracy of forecasting ===
Ahead of the launch of the 2009 World Energy Outlook, the British daily newspaper The Guardian, referring to an unidentified senior IEA official, alleged that the agency was deliberately downplaying the risk of peak oil under pressures from the US. According to a second unidentified former senior IEA official it was "imperative not to anger the Americans" and that the world has already entered the "peak oil zone".

The Guardian also referred to a team of scientists from Uppsala University in Sweden who studied the 2008 World Energy Outlook and concluded the forecasts of the IEA were unattainable. According to their peer-reviewed report, oil production in 2030 would not exceed 75 million barrels per day (11.9×10^{6} m^{3}/d) while the IEA forecasts a production of 105 million barrels per day (16.7×10^{6} m^{3}/d). The lead author of the report, Kjell Aleklett, has claimed that IEA's reports are "political documents". Other research from the same group has thoroughly reviewed oil projections done by the IEA World Energy Outlook.

The anticorruption NGO Global Witness wrote in its report Heads in the Sand that "Global Witness' analysis demonstrates that the Agency continues to retain an overly-optimistic, and therefore misleading, view about potential future oil production." According to Global Witness, "the Agency's over-confidence, despite credible data, external analysis and underlying fundamentals all strongly suggesting a more precautionary approach, has had a disastrous global impact."

In 2023, the IEA predicted that demand for fossil fuels such as oil, natural gas and coal would reach an all-time high by 2030. OPEC rejected the IEA's forecast, saying "what makes such predictions so dangerous, is that they are often accompanied by calls to stop investing in new oil and gas projects." The IEA forecasts that ammonia will meet approximately 45% of shipping fuel demands by 2050.

=== Restricting access to data ===
In 2021, the IEA was publicly criticized by more than 30 international academics and researchers at Our World in Data for publishing its detailed, global energy data behind paywalls, "[making] it unusable in the public discourse and [preventing] many researchers from accessing it". The authors of the Our World in Data suggested in an open letter that "countries that fund the IEA drop the requirement to place data behind paywalls and increase their funding".

In January 2022, the IEA announced plans to make all its data and analyses freely available and open-access, a move endorsed by its executive director and governing board. This initiative was awaiting final endorsement from IEA member countries to become effective.

In October 2023, the IEA made the World Energy Outlook 2023 dataset available for non-commercial use under a Creative Commons license. This dataset encompasses global aggregated data for various scenarios, alongside detailed regional and country-specific data up to 2050.

=== US shale ===
In 2018, the IEA was criticized at the World Economic Forum by Saudi Arabia's Oil Minister Al-Falih, for hyping the US shale oil industry amid forecasts of oversupply for the oil market in their January Oil Market Report. Al-Falih was exasperated with those claims, arguing that natural depletion, and strong demand growth meant that there was plenty of room for new supplies, while the shale drillers would not crash the market. He further said that the IEA is overstating the role of shale in a global market, and how the core job of the IEA, is not to take things out of context.

== See also ==
- World Energy Outlook
- Air Infiltration and Ventilation Centre
- Consensus Economics: Surveys of International Economic Forecasts
- Economics
- IEA Solar Heating and Cooling Programme
- International Energy Agency Energy in Buildings and Communities Programme
- International Atomic Energy Agency
- International Partnership for Energy Efficiency Cooperation
- International Renewable Energy Agency
- Nuclear Energy Agency
- One Watt Initiative
- OPEC
- Peak oil
- REN21
- SolarPACES
- Task 40
