= World Energy Outlook =

Publication of the International Energy Agency

The annual World Energy Outlook (WEO) is the International Energy Agency's (IEA) flagship publication on global energy projections and analysis. It contains medium to long-term energy market projections, extensive statistics, analysis and advice for both governments and the energy business regarding energy security, environmental protection and economic development. The first WEO was published in 1977 and it has been an annual publication since 1998.

The World Energy Outlook uses three scenarios to examine future energy trends. The Net Zero Emissions by 2050 Scenario is normative, in that it is designed to achieve specific outcomes – an emissions trajectory consistent with keeping the temperature rise in 2100 below 1.5 °C (with a 50% probability), universal access to modern energy services and major improvements in air quality – and shows a pathway to reach it. The Announced Pledges Scenario, and the Stated Policies Scenario are exploratory, in that they define a set of starting conditions, such as policies and targets, and then see where they lead based on model representations of energy systems, including market dynamics and technological progress. The scenarios are not predictions but enable policy-makers and other readers to compare different possible versions of the future and the levers and actions that produce them, with the aim of stimulating insights about the future of global energy.

Since 1993, the IEA has provided medium- to long-term energy projections using a continually-evolving set of modelling tools. In 2021, the IEA adopted the Global Energy and Climate Model to develop the world's first comprehensive study of how to transition to an energy system at net zero CO_{2} emissions by 2050. This model is now the principal tool used to generate detailed sector-by-sector and region-by-region long-term scenarios for the World Energy Outlook and other IEA publications.

== World Energy Outlook Reports by Year ==
WEO Report Year	Changes/Methodology
2000	"The 1998 and earlier editions were based on a "business-as-usual" approach, which projected energy trends in a world where no new policies were enforced to limit climate change. This year's WEO introduced a new "reference scenario", which took into account those greenhouse gas policies that had been adopted and were in place in OECD countries."
2001	
2002	"For the first time this year's Outlook extended its projection horizon to the year 2030."
2003	"The WEO 2003 attempted for the first time in the report's history to quantify global energy investment needs, fuel by fuel and region by region."
2004	
2005	"The 2005 edition presents a detailed assessment of energy prospects throughout the Middle East and North Africa region and the implications of these for world energy markets."
2006	
2007	"The 2007 report presents a special focus on China and India and analyses the impact of rising energy use in these countries on the international energy markets and energy-related greenhouse gas emissions."
2008	"The 2008 edition focuses on two pressing issues such as prospects for oil and gas production and the post-2012 climate scenarios."
2009	"The 2009 edition presents in-depth analysis of three special topics: Financing energy investment under a post-2012 climate framework; prospects for global natural gas markets and energy trends in Southeast Asia."
2010	"The 2010 WEO edition, released on 9 November 2010, presented for the first time in its history a scenario that takes account of the recent commitments that governments have made to tackle climate change and worsening energy insecurity. It also puts the spotlight on several topical issues, including the outlook for renewable energy technologies and unconventional oil, the implications of climate policies, Caspian energy prospects, energy poverty and energy subsidies."
2011	"The 2011 report was issued on 9 November 2011. The executive summary noted that there were "few signs that the urgently needed change in direction in global energy trends is underway." Richard G. Newell, associate professor of energy and environmental economics at Duke University notes: "Even as mature economies moderate oil demand through efficiency and biofuels, emerging economies' oil demand for transport grows by almost 50 percent. The bottom line is, like it or not, we should be prepared for price swings at the pump for some time to come.""
2012	"Fatih Birol, Chief Economist of the International Energy Agency (IEA) designed and directed the study which was prepared by the IEA's Directorate of Global Energy Economics of the International Energy Agency and other offices of the Agency. Based on the New Policies Scenario, the central model used by the OECD's International Energy Agency, in Part A entitled Global energy demands, on the emerging global energy landscape, over the period to 2035, global energy demand would increase by more one-third with China, India and the Middle East accounting for 60 percent of that increase.
2013	
2014	"This edition featured new projections which were extended, for the first time, to 2040."
2015	
2016	
2017	"WEO 2017 introduced a major new scenario – the Sustainable Development Scenario – that outlines an integrated approach to achieving internationally agreed objectives on climate change, air quality and universal access to modern energy."
2018	"The WEO 2018 series featured a special report on producer economies that explores how traditional oil and gas-exporting countries are adapting to a new price and policy environment, and what are the implications of longer-term structural changes in demand."
2019	
2020	"The usual long-term modelling horizons were kept but the focus for the World Energy Outlook 2020 was firmly on the next 10 years, exploring in detail the impacts of the Covid-19 pandemic on the energy sector, and the near-term actions that could accelerate clean energy transitions."
2021	
2022	"With the world in the midst of the first global energy crisis – triggered by Russia's invasion of Ukraine – the World Energy Outlook 2022 (WEO) focused analysis and insights on the implications of this profound and ongoing shock to energy systems across the globe."
2023	"Publishing the 72nd Statistical Review of World Energy is a significant moment for the Energy Institute (EI)." Download IEA Report
2024	"World Energy Outlook 2024"

== See also ==
- World energy supply and consumption
