= Assassination of Pim Fortuyn =

2002 murder in Hilversum, Netherlands

Coordinates: 52.234932°N 5.172430°E

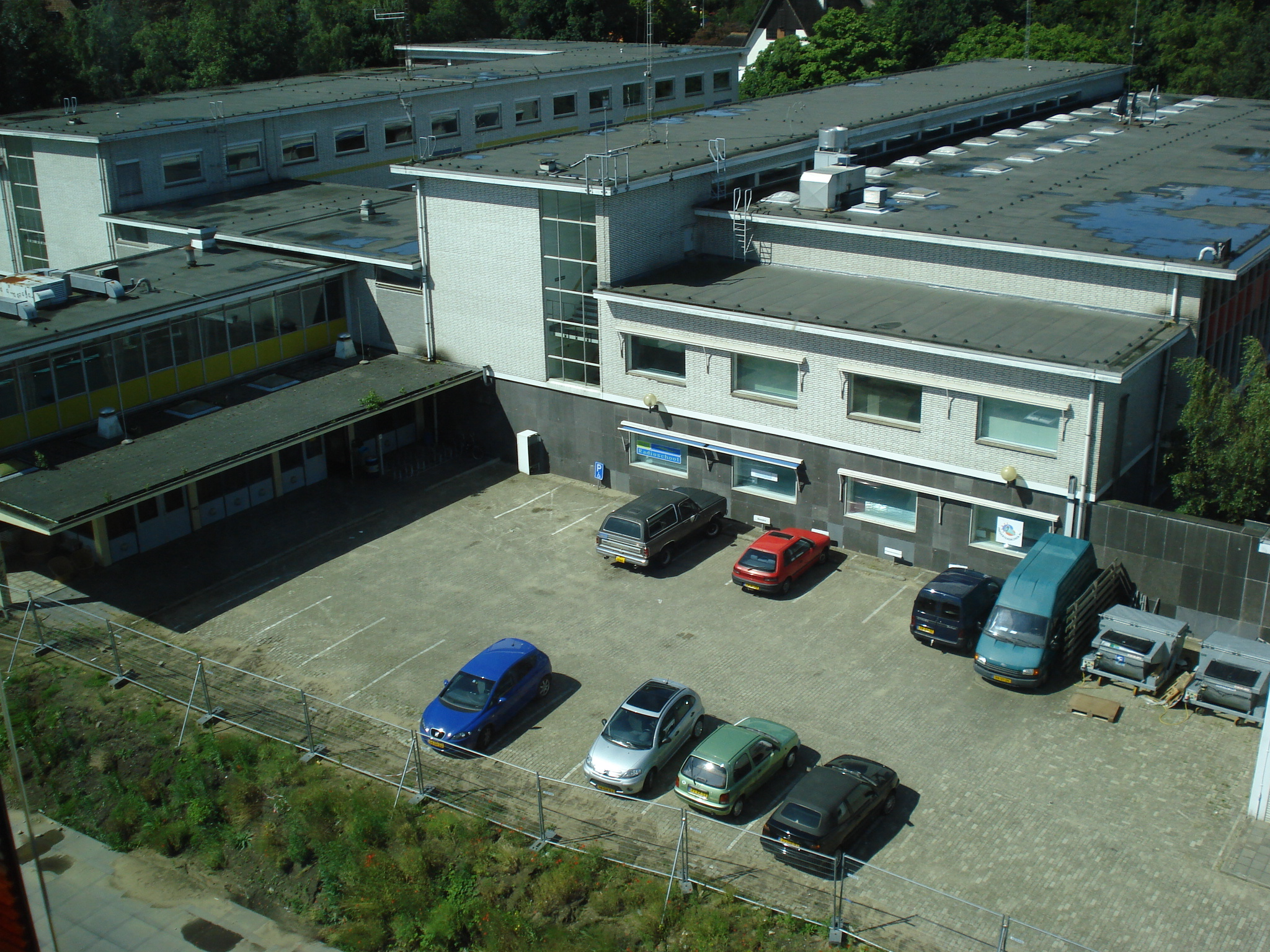
- The car park where Fortuyn was assassinated (directly behind the red car)
- Location: Hilversum, Netherlands
- Date: 6 May 2002; 18:06 (CEST)
- Target: Pim Fortuyn
- Attack type: Assassination
- Weapon: Star M-43 Firestar (9×19mm)
- Deaths: 1 (Fortuyn)
- Perpetrator: Volkert van der Graaf
- Motive: Left-wing extremism

Pim Fortuyn, a Dutch politician, was assassinated by Volkert van der Graaf in Hilversum, North Holland on 6 May 2002, nine days before the general election of 2002, in which he was leading the Pim Fortuyn List (LPF).

On a few occasions, Fortuyn had expressed his fear of being murdered: after being pied at the official release of his book De puinhopen van acht jaar Paars, as well as, most notably, on the talk show Jensen! on 22 March 2002. In court at his trial, Van der Graaf, an environmental and animal rights activist, said he murdered Fortuyn to stop him from exploiting Muslims as "scapegoats" and targeting "the weak members of society" in seeking political power. Van der Graaf was sentenced to eighteen years in prison. The sentence was upheld after he appealed. He was released on parole in 2014 after completing two-thirds of his sentence and has since lived in Apeldoorn, Gelderland.

== Attack ==
Fortuyn was 54 years old when he was shot dead by 32-year-old Volkert van der Graaf from Harderwijk. The attack occurred in a car park outside a radio studio where Fortuyn had just given an interview to Ruud de Wild at 3FM. The attacker was pursued by Fortuyn's driver, Hans Smolders, and was arrested shortly afterwards while still in possession of the handgun used to assassinate Fortuyn.

Van der Graaf was arrested near the scene of the crime after a pursuit by witnesses. Details of the suspect were always officially reported as "Volkert van der G." in accordance with unwritten Dutch privacy practice, but his full name was readily available on the internet. His home and work addresses were soon circulated on websites used by Fortuyn's supporters. Angry supporters gathered in several cities, so several people related to Van der Graaf went into hiding. His girlfriend and their daughter left their house on the evening of the murder.

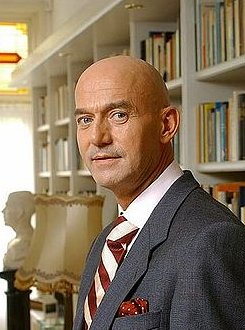
Photograph of Fortuyn taken on 4 May 2002, two days prior to his death.

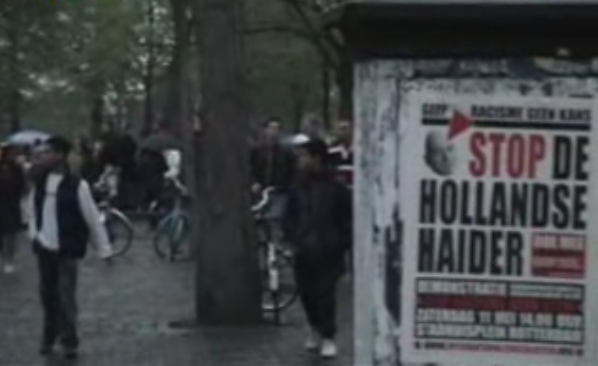
A photo of a poster near Fortuyn's house in Rotterdam depicting him as "The Dutch Haider" taken on 6 May 2002, the day of the assassination.

The details of the murder emerged later; the accounts of the investigators and Van der Graaf were consistent. He had planned the attack using information obtained from the Internet; printouts of a map of the scene of the crime and schedules of Fortuyn's appearances were found in his car. In two boxes of cartridges found at his home, seven cartridges were missing, the exact number loaded in his gun. The attack has been described as the work of a single person, an amateur shooter who used a relatively simple plan and did not prepare a good escape route.

Van der Graaf purchased his weapon and ammunition illegally; a semi-automatic Star Firestar M43 pistol in a café in Ede and 9mm cartridges in The Hague. After the murder of Fortuyn, the gun was linked to a suspect in the robbery of a jeweller in Emmen through DNA material found on the weapon. On the day of the murder, he attended work in the morning, taking with him a backpack containing the gun, a pair of latex gloves, a baseball cap and a pair of dark glasses. At the end of the morning, he said he was taking the afternoon off on account of the beautiful weather. He drove towards Hilversum, knowing that Fortuyn was due to be interviewed in the radio studio of 3FM in the Media Park. During the trip he stopped several times, among other things to purchase a razor to remove his stubble, which together with the cap and glasses would disguise his appearance, while the gloves would avoid leaving fingerprints. The razor did not work.

He had never visited the Media Park, relying on a map and a couple of photographs to find his way into the park on foot and to the building where Fortuyn's interview was held. Recognising Fortuyn's car in the car park, he hid in some nearby bushes, burying the gun which was in a plastic bag in a shallow trough in case he was discovered. He could hear fragments of Fortuyn's interview from a speaker on the outside of the building. He waited there for about two hours.

Fortuyn emerged from the building in the company of several others. Van der Graaf walked towards Fortuyn, passed by him, then turned and opened fire. He said that he aimed for the back to avoid Fortuyn's ducking away, or that a bullet would mistakenly hit somebody else. He held the gun in both hands, with the plastic bag around it. Less than 1.5 metres (4.9 ft) from Fortuyn, he hit him in the back and head five times. He fired a sixth shot that missed.

Running away, Van der Graaf was chased by Hans Smolders, Fortuyn's chauffeur. Two employees from a different building joined in. During the chase, Van der Graaf threatened them by raising the gun in his jacket pocket toward them. They ran from the grounds of the Media Park onto a public road, where Van der Graaf pointed the pistol at arm's length at Smolders. He had been reporting their position to the police by mobile phone. Reaching a petrol station, Van der Graaf gave up when police pointed their pistols at him.

== Motivations ==
During trial and after declaring a guilty plea, Van der Graaf openly answered questions in court, stating his opinion that Fortuyn was "as an ever-growing danger, particularly to vulnerable groups in society" and using "the weak parts of society to score points" as a means to political power, asking rhetorically, "I saw it as a danger, but what should you do about it?". Although in his same confessions he also offered some self-reflection, reportedly stating that he was "not proud" of the killing, and that he did not want to become either a "martyr" or a "savior of the Netherlands".

== Response ==
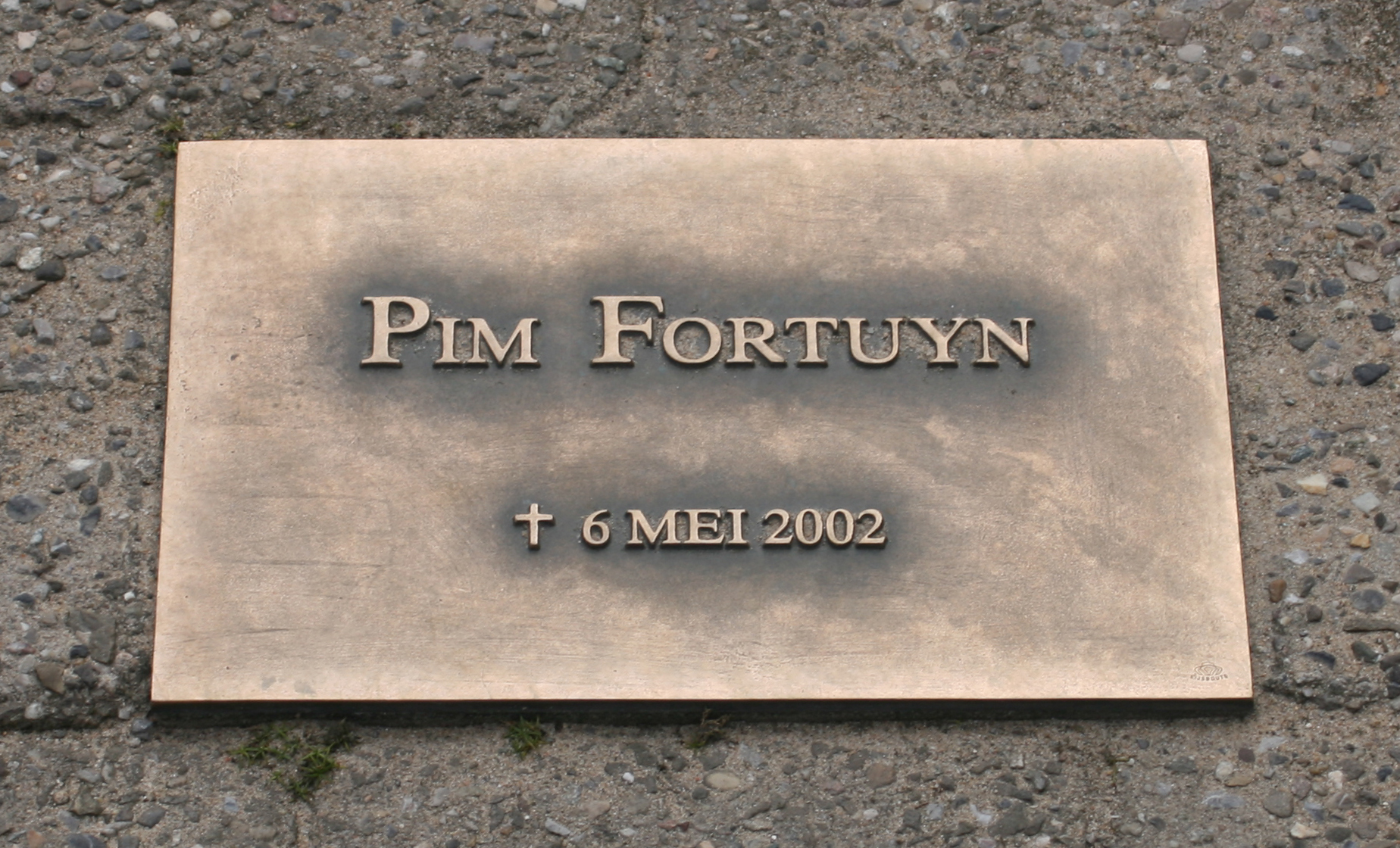
Commemorative plaque at the car park where Fortuyn was assassinated

The assassination shocked many in the Netherlands and exposed cultural clashes within the country. Riots broke out on the Binnenhof on the evening following the killing. Politicians from all political parties suspended campaigning, but the elections were not postponed. Under Dutch law, it was not possible to modify the ballots, so Fortuyn became a posthumous candidate. The Pim Fortuyn List (LPF) went on to make an unprecedented debut in the House of Representatives, winning 26 seats (17% of the 150 seats in the house). This success was short-lived. In the elections the following year, Pim Fortuyn seats dropped to eight. After the 2006 elections, the party had no seats in the House of Representatives.

On 15 April 2003, Volkert van der Graaf was convicted of assassinating Fortuyn and sentenced to 18 years in prison. He was released on parole in May 2014 after serving two-thirds of his sentence, the standard procedure under the Dutch penal system.

Pim Fortuyn is credited with changing the Dutch political landscape and culture with his ideology, which came to be known as Fortuynism. The 2002 elections were marked by large losses for the liberal People's Party for Freedom and Democracy and the social democratic Labour Party. Both parties replaced their leaders shortly after the election. The Pim Fortuyn List and Christian Democratic Appeal made significant gains. There have been others that speculate Fortuyn's perceived martyrdom may have played in favour of the Pim Fortuyn List.

The coalition cabinet which formed after the election of the Christian Democratic Appeal, Pim Fortuyn List and People's Party for Freedom and Democracy fell after three months, due to conflicts between LPF members. In the following elections, the Pim Fortuyn List returned eight seats in the House of Representatives and did not form part of the new government. However, political commentators speculated that there was still a sizable number of discontented voters who might have voted for a non-traditional party, if a viable alternative was available. In recent times, the right-wing Party for Freedom, which has a strong stance on immigration and integration, won nine seats in 2006 and 24 in 2010.

In a 2004 television show election, Fortuyn was chosen as De Grootste Nederlander ("Greatest Dutchman of All Time"), followed by William the Silent, the leader of the war for independence that established the precursor to the present-day Netherlands. The validity of this election, where votes were cast online and over the phone, was questioned and dismissed as being easily influenced by Fortuyn's supporters. The murder of film director Theo van Gogh for comments critical of Islam had occurred a few days before the election and many votes for Fortuyn were attributed to this event. It later turned out that William the Silent had received more votes, many of which were not counted before Fortuyn was declared the winner, due to technical problems.

After Fortuyn's death, the Netherlands' right-wing politicians, including former Minister for Integration and Immigration Rita Verdonk and representative Geert Wilders, increased in profile and prominence. Further, various conspiracy theories arose after Pim Fortuyn's murder that deeply affected Dutch politics and society.

The pistol used in the shooting has been donated to the Rijksmuseum, although it is not expected to be exhibited for "several decades".
