= Star Firestar M43 =

Series of single-action semi-automatic pistols

Star Firestar
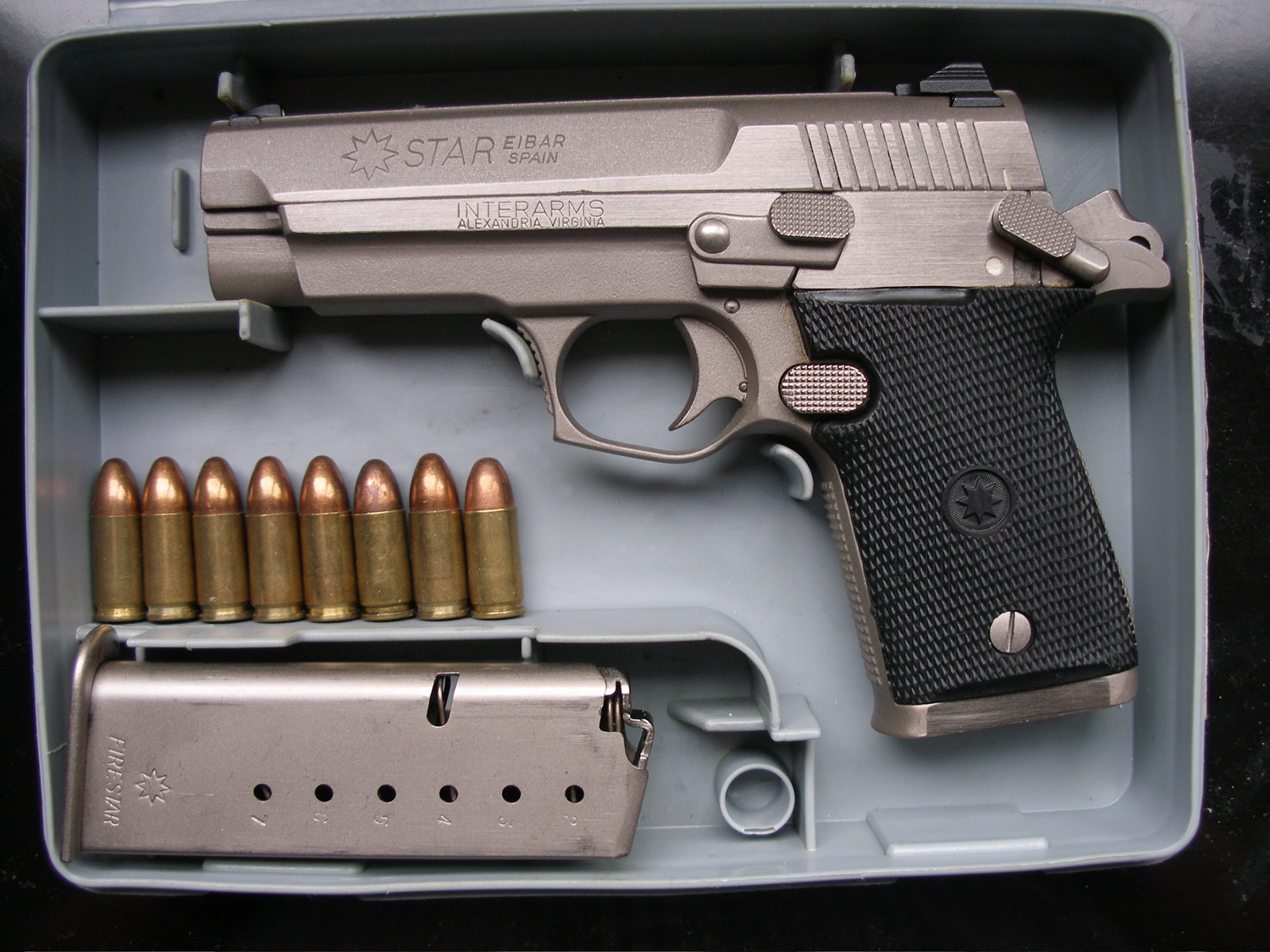
- Type: Semi-automatic pistol
- Place of origin: Spain

Production history
- Manufacturer: Star Bonifacio Echeverria, S.A.
- Produced: 1988 - 1997

Specifications
- Mass: 1.88 lbs (855 g) empty
- Length: 6.50 in (165 mm)
- Width: 1.10 in (28 mm) at grip
- Height: 4.61 in (117 mm)
- Cartridge: 9×19mm Parabellum
- Caliber: 9 mm
- Action: single action semi-automatic
- Muzzle velocity: 1,115 ft/s (340 m/s)
- Effective firing range: 164 ft (50 m)
- Maximum firing range: n/a
- Feed system: 7-round detachable box magazine
- Sights: Adjustable. The rear sight is able to be adjusted for windage by loosening the set-screw (with a tool included in the original package when sold new). The front sight ("blade") may also be adjusted by drifting it left or right.

The Star Firestar is a series of single-action semi-automatic pistol consisting of four models that received the 1991 Handgun of the Year Award from Guns & Ammo magazine.

== Design ==
The Firestar was available in 9 mm Para (M-43), .40 S&W (M-40), and .45 ACP (M-45) calibers, all having a single-stack magazine. A double-stack 9mm version (M-243) was also available and was commonly referred to by the unofficial name "Firestar Plus". The Firestar was produced by the now defunct Star Bonifacio Echeverria, S.A. in Eibar, Spain until 1994. The Firestar was imported into the United States by Interarms of Alexandria, Virginia.

Although its external appearance resembles a compact M1911, the Firestar is different in several respects. For example, the Firestar does not have the 1911's grip safety. The Firestar's safety features include an automatic safety at the firing pin (a feature not included in the 1911's original design but often found in more modern 1911 variants). The Firestar has operating procedures analogous to those of the Colt 1911: it is single action, and meant to be carried in Condition One (cocked and locked), with a cartridge in the chamber, cocked hammer and locked manual safety.

The Firestar is a compact, reliable and accurate handgun well-suited for backup or concealed carry. Its single-stack design sacrifices the superior magazine capacity of a double-stack, but permits a slim profile prized by many for concealed carry. While heavier than more modern handguns of comparable size made with today's composite materials, many shooters find the added heft provides a more stable shooting platform that improves accuracy.

== Notoriety ==
On 6 May 2002, Volkert van der Graaf used a Firestar M43 to assassinate Dutch politician Pim Fortuyn. The specific M43 used is currently held by The Rijksmuseum, a Dutch national museum in Amsterdam.

== See also ==
- Assassination of Pim Fortuyn
