= De Avonturen van Pa Pinkelman =

Dutch text comic

- From left to right: Flop, Tante Pollewop, Pa Pinkelman and Kareltje Flens
- Author(s): Godfried Bomans (story), Carol Voges (art)
- Current status/schedule: Terminated.
- Launch date: November 11, 1945
- End date: 1952
- Genre(s): Humor comics, Adventure comics, Satirical comics, Fantasy comics, Political comic strips

De Avonturen van Pa Pinkelman (The Adventures of Pa Pinkelman) was a Dutch text comic, written by Dutch novelist Godfried Bomans and illustrated by Carol Voges. It was published in the Dutch newspaper De Volkskrant between 1945 and 1952. The stories can be described as an absurd fantasy strip, originally intended for children, but gradually drawing in a more adult audience as well, due to references to then-actual political events.

== History ==
After the Netherlands were freed from German occupation in 1945, Godfried Bomans became chief of the cultural department of De Volkskrant. Together with illustrator Carol Voges, he made a newspaper comic strip about an old man with magical powers, Pa Pinkelman ("Father Pinkelman") and his jolly wife Tante Pollewop ("Aunt Pollewop"). They help a young boy, Kareltje Flens, who lives a rich and spoiled life, to get away from his luxury life and have some exotic adventures in the Zuiderzee, Urk, Schokland, Africa, the North Pole, the Sahara Desert, the United States of America and the Moon (later stories also bring them to Tibet, China and Japan). Pinkelman, Pollewop, Kareltje and his little black slave, Flop, travel together in all kinds of ways, but are constantly followed by three of Kareltje's servants who try to bring him back.

The stories have an absurd atmosphere, complete with jokes that break the fourth wall. In some episodes, Pinkelman also meets famous politicians of the late 1940s and early 1950s, such as Winston Churchill, Mohammad Mosaddegh, the Shah of Persia, Carl Romme, Joseph Stalin, Harry S. Truman, Dwight Eisenhower and Vyacheslav Molotov. Other stories make allusions on post-war situations, such as the collaboration and the atomic bomb. Bomans himself also made appearances in the strip.

The story was an immediate success, and Bomans was asked to write more sequels. After three more installments, the series finally came to a close in 1952 because the author felt it took up too much of his time.

Pa Pinkelman has been made available in novel format, with only a few of the images used as illustrations. Complete versions of the entire comic strip are also available.

== Adaptations ==
In 1964 the NCRV adapted the story as a black-and-white children's TV series. It had 20 episodes and was a rudimentary animated series based on Voges' original drawings, while Kitty Janssen and Wim de Haas provided voices.

Between October 25, 1976, and March 14, 1977, the KRO made another TV adaptation. This was a live-action series starring Ton van Duinhoven and Maya Bouma as Pinkelman and Pollewop.

== Legacy ==
Belgian comics artist Dirk Stallaert has expressed admiration for the stories of Pa Pinkelman.
