= Erik of het klein insectenboek (film) =

2004 Dutch film

- Theatrical release poster
- Directed by: Gidi van Liempd
- Produced by: Hans de Weers
- Starring: Jasper Oldenhof
- Cinematography: Hein Groot
- Edited by: Els Voorspoels
- Production companies: Egmond Film & Television; AVRO
- Distributed by: United International Pictures
- Release date: 9 December 2004
- Running time: 97 minutes
- Country: Netherlands
- Language: Dutch
- Box office: $770,615

Erik of het klein insectenboek (English translation: Erik or the small book of insects) is a 2004 Dutch family film, based on the homonymous book of Godfried Bomans: Erik of het klein insectenboek. It was co-produced with among others the Danish company Zeitgeist.

The film received a Golden Film for 100,000 visitors.

== Cast ==
- Jasper Oldenhof as Erik
- Anne-Mieke Ruyten as Erik's mother
- Yale Sackman as Rosalie
- Stany Crets as grasshopper
- Peter Van Den Begin as centipede
- Jaak Van Assche as Erik's grandfather
- Jörgen Raymann as bumblebee
- Marius Gottlieb as Papilio
- Lenette van Dongen as teacher
- Alfred van den Heuvel as Mister Vliesvleugel
