= De Grootste Nederlander =

Television program

De Grootste Nederlander ('The Greatest Dutchman') was a public poll held in 2004 by the broadcasting company KRO of the Publieke Omroep. The series has the BBC's 100 Greatest Britons TV format. During the series, it included individual programmes on the top ten, with viewers having further opportunities to vote after each programme.

The recently assassinated politician Pim Fortuyn was announced as the winner in a live television broadcast on 15 November 2004, two weeks after Theo van Gogh was murdered. This was controversial, and was said to be an "embarrassing" choice by several journalists and historians. Later it became revealed that William of Orange had received the most votes in total, but only the votes that were tallied before the end of the live programme counted (the number of calls was so large that not all could be counted before the end of the show). And thus Fortuyn remained the official number one according to the rules, as announced originally.

== Top 10 ==
Rank	Personality	Notability	Nomination defended by	Ref.
1	Pim Fortuyn	Politician. Admired by his followers for breaking with political correctness and criticizing Dutch politics. His murder made him a martyr for his case. His high position in the list was affected by the murder of Theo van Gogh only a few days before the contest was held. The program later revealed that William of Orange had received the most votes, but many could not be counted until after the official closing time of the television show (and the proclamation of the winner), due to technical problems. The official rules of the show said that votes counted before the end of the show would be decisive, but it was suggested that all votes correctly cast before the closing of the vote would be counted. Following the official rules, the outcome was not changed.	Yoeri Albrecht, journalist.	
2	William of Orange	Politician. Led the Dutch people during the Eighty Years' War against Spain, which eventually led to their independence. He himself never lived to see this, as he was assassinated. Is considered the "Father of the Nation" to this day.	Jacobine Geel, theologist, TV presenter and columnist.	
3	Willem Drees	Prime Minister (1948–1958). Re-elected four times in a row. Admired for helping the post-war country to get back on its feet and for his introduction of various social reform laws.	Wouter Bos, Dutch politician.	
4	Antonie van Leeuwenhoek	Biologist and microbiologist. Inventor of the microscope. Did pioneer work in cell biology and microbiology.	André Kuipers, astronaut.	
5	Desiderius Erasmus	Philosopher and novelist. Author of In Praise of Folly. Admired for his humanist philosophies.	Herman Pleij, medievalist.	
6	Johan Cruyff	Association football player and trainer. Universally considered to be one of the greatest and most influential football players of all time.	Michael van Praag, association football trainer and administrator.	
7	Michiel de Ruyter	Dutch admiral. Successfully defended his country during the 17th century from invaders at sea.	Rob de Wijk, historian.	
8	Anne Frank	Victim of the Holocaust, famous for her posthumously released diary, which gives an unforgettable account of her tragic life.	Xandra Schutte, journalist.	
9	Rembrandt van Rijn	Painter (The Night Watch, The Anatomy Lesson of Dr. Nicolaes Tulp, The Conspiracy of Claudius Civilis, The Jewish Bride, Syndics of the Drapers' Guild, Self-Portrait with Two Circles). Considered one of the greatest painters of all time, admired for his humanity and amazing mastery of the brush.	Ronald de Leeuw, art historian.	
10	Vincent van Gogh	Painter (Sunflowers, Starry Night, Bedroom in Arles, Café Terrace at Night). Admired for his groundbreaking techniques, which weren't recognized in his own lifetime. Lived and died as the classic example of the "suffering artist" and "misunderstood genius".	Jochum ten Haaf, actor.	

== From 11–50 ==
11. Aletta Jacobs (1854–1929) (Feminist)
12. Christiaan Huygens (1629–1695) (Scientist)
13. Annie M.G. Schmidt (1911–1995) (Writer)
14. Queen Juliana of the Netherlands (1909–2004) (Monarch)
15. Johan Rudolf Thorbecke (1798–1872) (Politician, social reformer)
16. Majoor Bosshardt (1913–2007) (Prominent member of the Dutch Salvation Army)
17. Anton Philips (1874–1951) (Businessman)
18. Freddy Heineken (1923–2002) (Businessman)
19. Hannie Schaft (1920–1945) (World War II resistance fighter)
20. Queen Wilhelmina of the Netherlands (1880–1962) (Monarch)
21. Baruch de Spinoza (1632–1677) (Philosopher)
22. Toon Hermans (1916–2000) (Comedian, poet)
23. Prince Claus (1926–2002) (Prince of the Netherlands)
24. Johan van Oldenbarnevelt (1547–1619) (Politician, executed)
25. Marco van Basten (1964–) (Football player)
26. Piet Pieterszoon Hein (1577–1629) (Admiral, national hero)
27. Joop den Uyl (1919–1987) (Politician)
28. Jan Adriaenszoon Leeghwater (1575–1650) (mill builder and hydraulic engineer)
29. Fanny Blankers-Koen (1918–2004) (Athlete)
30. Van Kooten en De Bie (Comedians)
31. Hugo de Groot (1583–1645) (Philosopher)
32. Johan de Witt (1625–1672) (Politician, murdered)
33. Anthony Fokker (1890–1939) (Aviation pioneer)
34. Multatuli (1820–1887) (Writer)
35. Prince Bernhard (1911–2004) (Prince of the Netherlands)
36. Wim Kok (1938–2018) (Politician)
37. M. C. Escher (1898–1972) (Graphical artist)
38. Marco Borsato (1966–) (Singer)
39. Eric Hazelhoff Roelfzema (1917–2007) (World War II resistance fighter)
40. DJ Tiësto (1969–) (DJ)
41. Queen Beatrix of the Netherlands (1938–) (Monarch)
42. Titus Brandsma (1881–1942) (Priest, World War II resistance activist, murdered)
43. Cornelis Lely (1854–1929) (Scientist)
44. Hans Teeuwen (1967–) (Comedian)
45. Joseph Luns (1911–2002) (Politician)
46. Leontien van Moorsel (1970–) (Athlete)
47. Willem Kolff (1911–2009) (inventor of hemodialysis)
48. Godfried Bomans (1913–1991) (Writer)
49. Hendrik Lorentz (1853–1928) (Scientist)
50. Abel Tasman (1603–1659) (Explorer)

== From 51–100 ==
51. Joop van den Ende (1942–) (Businessman)
52. André van Duin (1947–) (Comedian)
53. Joost van den Vondel (1587–1679) (Poet, Writer)
54. Rinus Michels (1928–2005) (Football Coach)
55. Mies Bouwman (1929–2018) (Television personality)
56. Willem Barentsz (Explorer) (c.1550–1597)
57. Ferdinand Domela Nieuwenhuis (1846–1919) (Politician)
58. Ruud Lubbers (1939–2018) (Politician)
59. Jan Tinbergen (1903–1994) (Economist)
60. Wim Sonneveld (1917–1974) (Comedian)
61. Joke Smit (1933–1981) (Feminist)
62. Frits Bolkestein (1933–) (Politician)
63. Jeroen Bosch (c.1450–1516) (Painter)
64. Johnny Kraaykamp, sr (1925–2011) (Actor)
65. Marga Klompé (1912–1986) (Politician, first female minister)
66. Johannes Vermeer (1632–1675) (Painter)
67. Dick Bruna (1927–2017) (Writer, illustrator)
68. Albert Plesman (1889–1953) (Aviation pioneer)
69. Joop Zoetemelk (1946–) (Cyclist)
70. Hella Haasse (1918–2011) (Writer)
71. Thomas à Kempis (c.1380–1471) (Monk)
72. Koning-Stadhouder Willem III of Orange (1650–1702) (Stadholder of Holland, King of England)
73. Kenau Simonsdochter Hasselaer (1526–1588) (Resistance fighter in the Eighty Years' War)
74. Johannes Diderik van der Waals (1837–1923) (Scientist)
75. Wubbo Ockels (1946–2014) (Astronaut)
76. Anna Maria van Schurman (1607–1678) (17th century female genius)
77. Herman Boerhaave (1668–1738) (botanist, humanist and physician)
78. Ruud Gullit (1962–) (Football player)
79. Monique van de Ven (1952–) (Actor)
80. Freek de Jonge (1944–) (Comedian)
81. Anton Pieck (1895–1987) (Painter)
82. Boudewijn de Groot (1944–) (Singer)
83. Willem Frederik Hermans (1921–1995) (Writer)
84. Pieter Jelles Troelstra (1860–1930) (Politician)
85. Albert Heijn (1865–1945) (Businessman)
86. Paul de Leeuw (1962–) (Television personality)
87. Jac. P. Thijsse (1865–1945) (Environmentalist)
88. Jan Wolkers (1925–2007) (Writer)
89. Piet Mondriaan (1872–1944) (Painter)
90. Simon Stevin (1548–1620) (Scientist)
91. Guillaume Groen van Prinsterer (1801–1876) (Politician)
92. Rutger Hauer (1944–2019) (Actor)
93. Harry Mulisch (1927–2010) (Writer)
94. Abraham Kuyper (1837–1920) (Politician)
95. Maarten Tromp (1598–1653) (Admiral, national hero)
96. Wim Kan (1911–1983) (Comedian)
97. Paul Verhoeven (1938–) (Director)
98. Belle van Zuylen (1740–1805) (Writer)
99. Ramses Shaffy (1933–2009) (Singer)
100. Abe Lenstra (1920–1985) (Football player)

== From 101–202 ==
101. Gerard Reve (1923–2006) (Writer)
102. Anton de Kom (1898–1945) (World War II resistance fighter of Surinamese descent, executed)
103. Max Euwe (1901–1981) (World Champion Chess)
104. Ko van Dijk (1916–1978) (Actor, director)
105. Gerrit van der Veen (1902–1944) (Sculptor, World War II resistance fighter, executed)
106. Hendrik Petrus Berlage (1856–1934) (Architect)
107. Heike Kamerlingh Onnes (1853–1926) (Scientist)
108. Anton Geesink (1934–2010) (Athlete)
109. Bert Haanstra (1916–1997) (World War II resistance fighter, director)
110. Claudius Civilis (Hero of the Batavian rebellion)
111. C.H.D. Buys Ballot (1817–1890) (Scientist)
112. Jan Pieterszoon Coen (1587–1629) (Admiral, Governor of the Dutch East Indies)
113. Samuel van Houten (1837–1930) (Politician)
114. Ard Schenk (1944–) (Athlete)
115. Nico Tinbergen (1907–1988) (Biologist, Nobel Prize winner)
116. King Willem I of the Netherlands (1772–1843) (Monarch)
117. Mary Dresselhuys (1907–2004) (Actress)
118. Simon Carmiggelt (1913–1987) (Writer)
119. John de Mol (1955–) (Businessman)
120. Gerrit Rietveld (1888–1964) (Architect, designer)
121. Frank Martinus Arion (1936–2015) (Poet, writer, linguist)
122. Hans van Mierlo (1931–2010) (Politician)
123. Hadewych (Writer)
124. Jan Pieterszoon Sweelinck (1562–1621) (Composer)
125. Geert Groote (1340–1384) (Theologist)
126. Sonja Barend (1940–) (Feminist, television personality)
127. Joan van der Capellen tot den Pol (1741–1784) (Politician)
128. Jan van Speijk (1802–1831) (National hero)
129. Anton Corbijn (1955–) (Photographer)
130. Pieter Corneliszoon Hooft (1581–1647) (Poet, historian)
131. Bernard Haitink (1929–2021) (Conductor)
132. Willem van Loon (1891–1975) (Businessman)
133. Karel Appel (1921–2006) (Painter)
134. Johan Huizinga (1872–1945) (Historian)
135. Suze Groeneweg (1875–1940) (Politician)
136. Graaf Floris V (1254–1296) (Monarch)
137. Koning Louis Bonaparte (1778–1846)
138. L.E.J. Brouwer (1881–1966) (Mathematician)
139. Tobias Asser (1838–1913) (Lawyer, Nobel Prize winner)
140. Rem Koolhaas (1944–) (Architect)
141. Jacob Cats (1577–1660) (Poet, politician)
142. Alexandra Radius (1942–) (Ballet dancer)
143. Eva Besnyö (1910–2003) (photographer)
144. Jan Rutgers (Activist)
145. Reinier Paping (1931–2021) (Athlete)
146. Paul Huf (1924–2002) (Photographer)
147. P. J. H. Cuypers (1827–1931) (Architect)
148. Paul Crutzen (1933–2021) (Scientist)
149. Samuel Sarphati (1813–1866) (Doctor)
150. Frits Fentener van Vlissingen (1882–1962) (Businessman)
151. Joris Ivens (1898–1989) (Director)
152. Pieter Brueghel (1525–1569) (Painter)
153. Frans Hals (1582–1666) (Painter)
154. Simon Vestdijk (1898–1971) (Poet)
155. Olivier van Noort (1558–1627) (Explorer)
156. Hendrik Colijn (1869–1944) (Politician)
157. Willem Beukelszoon (Fisherman)
158. Viktor & Rolf (Designers)
159. Cornelis Verolme (1900–1981) (Businessman)
160. Lucebert (1924–1994) (Poet)
161. Sjoukje Dijkstra (1942–2024) (Athlete)
162. Henri Polak (1868–1943) (Politician)
163. Loe de Jong (1914–2005) (Historian)
164. Ed van der Elsken (1925–1990) (Photographer)
165. Hans van Manen (1932–2025) (Choreographer)
166. Theo Thijssen (1879–1943) (Writer)
167. Jan Steen (c.1626–1679) (Painter)
168. Anton Dreesmann (1923–2000) (Businessman)
169. Jaap Eden (1873–1925) (Athlete)
170. Willem Marinus Dudok (1884–1974) (Architect)
171. Johnny Jordaan (1924–1989) (Singer)
172. Benno Premsela (1920–1997) (Architect)
173. Louis Davids (1883–1939) (Comedian)
174. Marlene Dumas (1953–) (Painter)
175. Erwin Olaf (1959–2023) (Photographer)
176. Martinus Nijhoff (1894–1953) (Writer, poet)
177. Cristina Deutekom (1931–2004) (Singer)
178. Jacob Olie (1834–1905) (Photographer)
179. Willem de Kooning (1904–1997) (Painter)
180. Remco Campert (1929–2022) (Writer, poet)
181. Herman Gorter (1864–1927) (Poet)
182. Faas Wilkes (1923–2006) (Football player)
183. W.A. Visser ‘t Hooft (1900–1985) (Theologist)
184. Ada Kok (1947–) (Athlete)
185. Herman Daendels (1762–1818) (Politician)
186. Rudi Carrell (1934–2006) (Television personality)
187. Pierre Bokma (1955–) (Actor)
188. Louis Andriessen (1939–2021) (Composer)
189. Henk Hofland (1927–2016) (Reporter)
190. Jacob van Campen (1596–1657) (Architect)
191. Pieter Cort van der Linden (1846–1935) (Politician)
192. Jacob van Ruisdael (c.1629–1682) (Painter)
193. Theo van Doesburg (1883–1931) (Painter)
194. Pieter Jansz. Saenredam (1597–1665) (Painter)
195. Ootje Oxenaar (1929–2017) (Graphic artist)
196. Rineke Dijkstra (1959–) (Artist/Photographer)
197. Hendrik Doeff (1764–1837) (Dutch commissioner in the Dejima trading post)
198. Fons Rademakers (1920–2007) (Director)
199. Reinbert de Leeuw (1938–2020) (Conductor)
200. Erik de Vries (Television pioneer)
201. Jan Dibbets (1941–) (Artist)
202. Johan van der Keuken (1938–2001) (Director)

== See also ==
- Greatest Britons spin-offs
