= Hendrik Jan Schoo =

Dutch columnist, journalist and writer

- Born: Hendrik Jan Schoo; 10 November 1945; Amsterdam, Netherlands
- Died: 5 September 2007 (aged 61); Leiden, Netherlands
- Education: University of Chicago
- Occupations: Journalist, essayist, editor

Hendrik Jan Schoo (born 10 November 1945; died 9 September 2007), also known as HJ Schoo, was a Dutch author, journalist, essayist and magazine editor. He served as the editor-in-chief of Elsevier magazine and was the deputy editor of de Volkskrant newspaper for which he wrote columns.

== Biography ==
Schoo was born in Amsterdam. His father was a sales representative and his mother a nurse. He was a brother of politician and government minister Eegje Schoo. He initially trained as a teacher before going to study social sciences at the University of Chicago. He later worked at an African-American primary school before returning to the Netherlands.

== Career ==
Schoo began his career as an editor and writer for Montessori Communications, a publication of the Dutch Montessori Association. He then worked for a psychology publication before joining Elsevier in 1991 as a columnist, rising up to become deputy editor and then chief editor from 1993 to 1999. Politically, Schoo took on a conservative slant and was critical of multiculturalism in his opinion columns. One of Schoo's most notable acts as editor was appointing sociology professor Pim Fortuyn as a columnist in 1993. Both Schoo and Fortuyn would influence each other's beliefs, and the column helped Fortuyn to gain more public exposure in the Netherlands before he embarked on a political career. At the end of 1999, Schoo resigned from Elsevier to become deputy editor-in-chief of de Volkskrant.

== Personal life ==
Schoo was married twice, first to Dutch writer Xandra Schutte by whom he had a son. He died following complications after heart surgery in 2007.
