= De puinhopen van acht jaar Paars =

- The book cover features a picture of Fortuyn saluting at a 2001 Livable Netherlands meeting, along with a subtitle that promises to provide the reader with a "merciless analysis" of the public sector alongside recommendations on how to restore it to its former glory.
- Author: Pim Fortuyn
- Cover artist: Select Interface
- Language: Dutch
- Subject: Various political issues, from healthcare reform to immigration policy.
- Genre: Political non-fiction
- Publisher: Karakter (Uithoorn), Speakers Academy (Rotterdam)
- Publication date: de facto: March 12, 2002 officially: March 14, 2002
- Publication place: Netherlands
- Pages: 186
- ISBN: 90-6112-911-7
- OCLC: 783055562
- LC Class: JN5801 .F674 2002

De puinhopen van acht jaar Paars (pronounced [də ˈpœynɦoːpə(ɱ) vɑn ɑx.tɕaːr ˈpaːrs], English: The Wreckage of Eight Years of Purple) is a political non-fiction book released by the Dutch political commentator and aspiring lawmaker Pim Fortuyn in 2002, two months prior to his assassination. In the book, Fortuyn sharply criticizes the then ruling "Purple" coalition government and its direct predecessor (both composed of PvdA, VVD and D66) on nearly all areas of their policies.

The book went on to become the first and only bestseller for Fortuyn, whose previous writing career had not yielded any great successes. Puinhopen was reprinted more than nine times, and had sold 270,000 copies by its tenth anniversary in 2012.

De puinhopen van acht jaar paars was termed by many Dutch media, as well as by Fortuyn himself, the official election manifesto of the Pim Fortuyn List (of which Fortuyn was the founder and lijsttrekker), but Fortuyn later retracted these claims.

== History ==
In August 2001, Pim Fortuyn declared he was going to enter national politics. Although at that time he had not yet aligned himself with the recently founded Livable Netherlands, he did express his intention to release a book later on that year which would be titled Acht jaar wachtlijsten (Eight years of waiting lists) and would reflect on the two consecutive Purple administrations. When Livable Netherlands asked him to be their lijsttrekker, Fortuyn declared that their electoral manifesto had to be in line with his upcoming book.

Acht jaar wachtlijsten was at first to be released by the formerly Marxist publisher Van Gennep, which had also published a previous work by Fortuyn. However, Van Gennep parted ways with Fortuyn in November 2001 when the latter became close to confirmation as lijsttrekker of Livable Netherlands, citing the incompatibility between their Marxist roots and the party's political positions. Karakter B.V., an imprint of Uithoorn, was announced as taking over as publisher.

After Fortuyn and Livable Netherlands ended their cooperation, Fortuyn founded his own party called the "Pim Fortuyn List". Whenever he was asked what his new party's policies were going to be, Fortuyn generally referred to his soon to be published book by way of answer.

In February 2002, Fortuyn reported to de Volkskrant that this book was now to be called De puinhopen van acht jaar Paars. On this occasion, he also said that his rationale for authoring it was the perceived laziness of the Dutch media. "As you may know, the press is too lazy to read anyway. So I have summarized my thirteen books in De puinhopen van acht jaar Paars," Fortuyn was quoted as saying.

== Synopsis ==
De puinhopen van acht jaar Paars is divided into ten chapters (including an epilogue). Each of these chapters addresses one aspect of the Purple government's policies that, in Fortuyn's view, required "unreserved criticism". The chapters are titled politics (this chapter also serves as an introduction to the rest of the book), healthcare, education, security, restyling of the welfare state, agriculture and infrastructure, public government, immigration policy, and foreign affairs.

== Publication ==
Release of the book was planned for March 14, but it was accidentally available two days earlier because the publisher failed to instruct book shops about the embargo for the intended date. In many stores, the book sold out on March 12, and the initial printing of 10,000 was already almost exhausted by March 13; a second printing, again of 10,000 copies, had already been ordered one day prior.

Fortuyn's assassination on May 6 helped to augment the sales of Puinhopen even further. Between May 6 and May 16, 2002, Karakter had to order three new printings together consisting of over 25,000 copies, bringing total circulation up until that point to 125,000.

The book went on to become one of the biggest commercial hits of the Dutch book trade in 2002, selling over 150,000 copies in the year of its release alone. That year De puinhopen van acht jaar paars was the best-selling non-fiction book in the Netherlands, the third overall best-selling book (after Nicci French's Land of the Living and Donna Tartt's The Little Friend), and the best-selling book by a Dutch author.

Sales of De puinhopen van acht jaar paars fell off in the summer of 2002. However, in May 2003, coinciding with the first commemoration of Fortuyn's death, Puinhopen saw a small sales figure jump, with book stores purchasing "hundreds" of copies to sell to their customers.

In the run-up to the tenth commemoration of Fortuyn's death in 2012, Karakter announced the total sales of Puinhopen to be 270,000. On May 14 of that year, an e-book version of the book was released.

=== Pieing incident ===
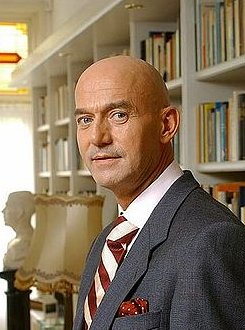
Fortuyn claimed he was able to share a laugh about the incident, but felt bruised in his integrity nonetheless.

On March 14, Fortuyn officially presented De puinhopen van acht jaar Paars in the political society Nieuwspoort (News gate) in The Hague. The event garnered massive press attendance as Fortuyn had become a major agenda setter. During the conference, Fortuyn was pied by members of the Biologische bakkers Brigade (literally: "biological bakers' brigade"), a radical left-wing movement who claimed that Fortuyn's "racism" should not be given a voice, as well as wishing Fortuyn's party to receive zero seats in the upcoming elections. On her way out of Nieuwspoort, one of the perpetrators claimed she attacked Fortuyn with a pie because she felt what she referred to as Fortuyn's racism was not a matter of opinion, but should be treated as a felony.

After this incident, Fortuyn began expressing fear of being murdered. After resumption of the event he scolded prime minister Wim Kok for not protecting all of his citizens. Fortuyn's supporters also blamed the attending journalists for not doing anything to stop the pie attacks.

== Reception ==
Job Frieszo of the television news program NOS Journaal reviewed the book on its release day, calling it "unusual" for an election manifesto to reflect the opinion of just one individual. Ideas like withdrawing from the Schengen Agreement were branded "unrealistic". Current affairs show Nova / Den Haag Vandaag called it the "funniest election manifesto so far".

Hubert Smeets of NRC Handelsblad wrote a generally negative review of the book, in which he compared Fortuyn to a burglar and rejected his ideas as duplicitous. "Things could get crowded with shopping carts and cardboard boxes in the hallways of the non-privatised railway stations or other indoor places", he concludes.

Kees Lunshof of De Telegraaf was negative as well, claiming Puinhopen was "pubtalk", "nonsense" and "asocial", whereas Het Parool writer Kees Tamboer praised Fortuyn's plans for amending the law on sick leave in The Netherlands.

In an op-ed of May 2012, De Volkskrant columnist Martin Sommer dubbed Puinhopen "indeed an unusual pamphlet". Citing Fortuyn's reference to his departed mother and his colorful language, Sommer saw a world of differences between it and election manifestos of, for instance, the CDA and PvdA parties.

== Political reaction ==
Political response to Puinhopen came immediately. On March 14, while the press conference on the book's release was still going on, members of the Socialist Party approached Fortuyn with a pamphlet containing their party's analysis of Fortuyn's views. It was titled Leest u zijn boeken maar – de pimpelpaarse antwoorden van Pim Fortuyn (Just read his books – the deep purple responses from Pim Fortuyn) and concluded that Fortuyn embraced right-wing solutions to problems caused by right-wing politics. According to the socialists, if Fortuyn's policies were adopted he would be even more purple than the Purple administrations themselves. However, SP leader Jan Marijnissen also lambasted other political leaders who thought reading the book was not worth their time.

The lijsttrekker of the CDA, Jan Peter Balkenende, agreed with the SP's criticism that Fortuyn offered only purple solutions. Balkenende was negative about Fortuyn's "return to the government" when looking for solutions, as well as his calls for ending the year-on-year increases in the respective healthcare and education budgets.

The reception of Puinhopen from the ruling PvdA and VVD parties was largely negative. Although prime minister Wim Kok considered Puinhopen to be "a good read", he criticized Fortuyn for penning "the most abhorrent accusations" against his administration. According to Kok, Fortuyn's claims were "on the edge of being acceptable". Ad Melkert, the lijsttrekker of the PvdA, stated that Fortuyn would make the Netherlands "less strong, and less social", while VVD party leader and lijsttrekker Hans Dijkstal stated that he "held his breath" when reading the book, and lamented the absence of a paragraph stating the financial consequences of Fortuyn's ideas.

== Legacy ==
The title of the book (sometimes simply stated as De puinhopen van Paars) has gained widespread notoriety to depict the policies of the first and the second Kok cabinets in a negative way. Occasionally the term has also been applied to the second Rutte cabinet at the start of the 2012-2017 legislature (particularly by Geert Wilders) or as a synonym for Fortuyn's 2002 general election campaign.

On the last page of Puinhopen, Fortuyn promised a sequel, which he planned to release in four years' time, at the end of the next legislature, and in which he would dwell on the successes and failures of his parliamentary career. This sequel never saw the light of day, because Fortuyn was shot and killed on May 6, 2002.

On April 25 a group of Dutch comedians released a book parodying Puinhopen called De puinhopen van professor Pim Fortuyn (The Wreckage of Professor Pim Fortuyn). According to its authors, the aim was to show the audience that everyone was able to write a book filled with "stupid plans". Although initial sales of the parody book were good, 10,000 copies within the first few days of its release, it was pulled off the market following Fortuyn's death.

Puinhopen also inspired Flemish N-VA politician Geert Bourgeois to write De puinhoop van paars-groen (The wreckage of purple-green) in late 2002. In this book Bourgeois accuses the then current cabinet of Belgium of misgovernment. According to Bourgeois, the word puinhopen was the only justified term to summarize three years of Purple-Green.
