= Erik of het klein insectenboek =

1941 Dutch children's novel by Godfried Bomans

Eric in the Land of the Insects
- 1942 edition
- Author: Godfried Bomans
- Original title: Erik of het klein insectenboek (Erik or the small book of insects)
- Translator: Regina Louise Kornblith
- Language: Dutch
- Genre: Children's literature
- Publication date: 1941
- Publication place: Netherlands
- English publication date: 1994

Eric in the Land of the Insects, originally called Erik of het klein insectenboek (English: Erik or the small book of insects) in Dutch, is a 1941 Dutch children's novel by Godfried Bomans. It is widely seen as a children's classic and Bomans' magnum opus.

== Plot ==
Erik Pinksterblom is a little nine-year-old boy who lies in bed at night, worried about a test about insects he has to perform at school tomorrow. Suddenly, the paintings in his bedroom come alive, including one depicting a meadow full of insects. Erik climbs into the painting where he meets several talking insect characters.

First, he meets a snobbish and rich family of wasps. Erik unintentionally gives offense when he recites a poem about the "busy bee" – it turns out the wasps despise bees, because they work for people. After dinner, Erik joins the wasps in playing some music, using flies as string instruments, but he's forced to leave the party early when Erik accidentally causes the house fly he was playing to die.

A bumblebee who claims to be a philosopher brings him to a hotel, made from a huge snail's house. Erik surprises everybody by reciting interesting facts about insects he read in a natural history book. While all the insects are amazed, they are also scared often doing anything if it's not reported in the book. Erik can comfort them by telling them they just have to follow their natural instincts.

In one of the hotel rooms, a caterpillar changes into a butterfly. Together, he and Erik leave the hotel. Later, the butterfly meets a female butterfly with whom he falls in love. Erik helps him write a poem for her and eventually the couple gets married, leaving Erik alone.

As Erik walks through the forest, he gets into a fight with a spider. Knocked unconscious, Erik is dragged away by a burying beetle. The beetle considers himself to be the most important animal because all creatures live and die to serve as his dinner. His theory is destroyed when his entire family turns out to have been eaten by a mole.

Erik then meets a rain worm who thinks he is superior to all the others, because he has no need for things like limbs and eyes. However, the worm ties himself into a knot and needs Erik to find somebody to help untie him. As Erik searches for help, he is adopted by an ant colony. He once again amazes them with his knowledge about insects, but gets homesick and asks them to bring him back. While the ants travel along with them to the edge of the painting they meet another ant army, whereupon a large battle takes place.

Eventually, Erik wakes up. Despite being back home, he's disappointed to find that humans are much like the insects he met. He longs to get back to the meadow, but the paintings in his bedroom never come alive again. At his school test, he writes about the experiences he had during his time with the insects and fails as a result – he's even forced to stay in detention.

== History ==
The book is seen as Bomans' most famous and acclaimed work. Right from the start, it was a tremendous bestseller, with ten reprints in the first year. The story both appealed to children as well as adults due to its satirical levels.

In 1994, the book was translated into English as Eric in the Land of the Insects by Regina Louise Kornblith.

In 2013, the book was the central book in the Nederland Leest (Netherlands Reads) campaign of the CPNB.

== Adaptations ==
In 1979, 1995 and 2007, the story was adapted into a television series.

In 1990, the novel was adapted into a comic book by Luc Morjaeu.

In 1992, Peter Drost adapted the story into a solo theater performance. A theater group called "De Jonge Honden" also adapted the story into the play "Insect" (2008).

In 2004, a film adaptation, Erik of het klein insectenboek, was made by director Gidi van Liempd. This film adaptation was also made into a TV series in 2007.
