= Volkert van der Graaf =

Dutch convicted murderer (born 1969)

- Born: 9 July 1969 (age 57); Middelburg, Netherlands
- Occupation: Environmental activist
- Children: 1
- Status: Free after end of parole
- Criminal charge: Murder of Pim Fortuyn
- Penalty: 18 years imprisonment (released after serving 12 years)

Details
- Weapon: Star Firestar M43

Volkert van der Graaf (born 9 July 1969) is a Dutch convicted murderer who assassinated politician Pim Fortuyn, the leader of the Pim Fortuyn List (LPF) party, on 6 May 2002. Van der Graaf, an environmental and animal rights activist, shot Fortuyn outside a radio studio in Hilversum shortly after Fortuyn gave an interview during the political campaign for the Dutch general election of 2002. Van der Graaf was arrested shortly after shooting Fortuyn, who died immediately.

In court, Van der Graaf testified that he had become alarmed that Fortuyn was using Muslims and immigrants as scapegoats in a campaign to seek political power. He thought the politician endangered society with his controversial statements. His trial started on 27 March 2003. He was convicted on 15 April 2003 and sentenced to 18 years in prison. The trial generated large interest from the Dutch public, especially from supporters of Fortuyn. Some Fortuyn supporters and political commentators argued that the political left and the media had created a climate that had enabled Van der Graaf's actions through demonising Fortuyn.

After his conviction, Van der Graaf appealed for the reduction of the sentence to 16 years, but on 18 July 2003, the appeals court upheld the previous sentence. He was released on parole in May 2014. His parole ultimately expired on 30 April 2020, delivering him from the remaining restrictions.

== Family life and education ==
Van der Graaf was born in Middelburg, in the province of Zeeland. By the time he attended university in Wageningen, he had become a vegan and an advocate of animal rights. At the time of the murder he lived with his girlfriend and their infant daughter in Harderwijk.

== Career ==
Van der Graaf worked for the environmental organisation Vereniging Milieu Offensief in Wageningen, which he had co-founded in 1992. His job involved challenging violators of environmental regulations through litigation. He concentrated particularly on contesting practices in intensive animal farming and fur farming. He was said to be highly motivated, working more than the four days per week of his contract. He was successful at litigation, winning about three out of every four cases.

== Murder of Fortuyn ==
At 6:00 pm on 6 May 2002, Pim Fortuyn was shot outside a radio studio in Hilversum, just after he finished an interview. He was killed instantly. Interviewer Ruud de Wild witnessed the murder.

Van der Graaf was arrested near the scene of the crime after a pursuit by witnesses. Details of the suspect were officially reported as "Volkert van der G.", in accordance with unwritten Dutch privacy practice, but his full name was readily available on the internet. His home and work addresses were soon circulated on websites used by Fortuyn's supporters. Angry supporters gathered in several cities, and several people related to Van der Graaf went into hiding. His girlfriend and their daughter left their house on the evening of the murder.

The details of the murder emerged later; the accounts of the investigators and Van der Graaf were consistent. He had planned the attack using information obtained from the Internet; printouts of a map of the scene of the crime and schedules of Fortuyn's appearances were found in his car. In two boxes of cartridges found at his home, seven cartridges were missing, the exact number loaded in his gun. The attack has been described as the work of a single person, an amateur shooter who used a relatively simple plan and did not prepare a good escape route.

Van der Graaf purchased his weapons illegally: a semi-automatic Star Firestar M43 pistol in a café in Ede and 9mm cartridges in The Hague. After the murder of Fortuyn, the gun was linked to a suspect in the robbery of a jeweller in Emmen through DNA analysis.

On the day of the murder, he attended work in the morning, taking with him a backpack containing the gun, a pair of latex gloves, a baseball cap and a pair of dark glasses. At the end of the morning, he said he was taking the afternoon off because of the good weather. He drove towards Hilversum, knowing that Fortuyn was due to be interviewed in the radio studio of 3FM in the Media Park. During the trip he stopped several times, among other things to purchase a razor to remove his stubble, which together with the cap and glasses would disguise his appearance, while the gloves would avoid leaving fingerprints. The razor did not work.

He had never visited the Mediapark, relying on a map and a couple of photos to find his way into the park on foot and to the building where Fortuyn's interview was held. Recognising Fortuyn's car in the car park, he hid in some nearby bushes, burying the gun, which was in a plastic bag, in a shallow trough in case he was discovered. He could hear fragments of Fortuyn's interview from a speaker on the outside of the building. He waited there for about two hours.

Fortuyn emerged from the building in the company of several others, including De Wild. Van der Graaf walked towards Fortuyn, passed by him, then turned and opened fire. He said that he aimed for the back to avoid Fortuyn's ducking away or a bullet mistakenly hitting somebody else. He held the gun in both hands, with the plastic bag around it. Less than 1.5 metres (4.9 ft) from Fortuyn, he hit him in the back and head five times, and fired a sixth shot that missed.

Running away, Van der Graaf was chased by Hans Smolders, Fortuyn's chauffeur. Two employees from a different building joined in. During the chase, Van der Graaf threatened them by raising the gun in his jacket pocket toward them. They ran from the grounds of the Mediapark onto a public road, where Van der Graaf pointed the pistol at arm's length at Smolders, who had been reporting their position to the police by mobile phone. Reaching a gas station, Van der Graaf gave himself up when police pointed their pistols at him.

== Investigations and trial ==
=== Initial investigations and conspiracy theories ===
For several months Van der Graaf refused to make any statement about the murder, on the advice of his lawyers. He was represented by Böhler, Koppe and Franken, with Böhler leading.

In the months following the murder, many conspiracy theories were put forth by supporters of Fortuyn and others. Officials investigating the murder dismissed these popular rumours, declaring that no evidence had been found for the involvement of others. No evidence was found to support rumors that Van der Graaf had committed the earlier murder in 1996 of Chris van de Werken, an environmental official from Nunspeet, or that he attended other appearances by Fortuyn.

On 7 July 2006, the national daily newspaper De Telegraaf published an article alleging Van der Graaf's connection with the murder of Van der Werken. De Telegraaf printed extracts of a secret police report on the murder of Van der Werken on its website. Quirijn Meijnen, a Dutch-based media lawyer who represented Van der Graaf, said the accusations were grave and unfounded, and that the publication of extracts of the secret police report infringed Van der Graaf's privacy rights. De Telegraaf failed to mention that Van der Graaf was never a suspect in the murder case of Van der Werken.

After Van der Graaf's arrest, he was held in strict isolation until 1 June. He could speak only to his lawyers and police and justice officials. He was kept under constant observation by video camera.

A second search of Van der Graaf's home on 24 June found a chemical mixture, calcium chlorate and sugar, hidden in 35 condoms in his garage. Nearby were flasks of sulphuric acid. Experts said the substances could be combined to make a fire bomb or explosive material. Van der Graaf later said that he had fabricated the materials around 1990–1992 for experimentation purposes and had forgotten about them. Detectives also conducted a search on Graaf's personal computer and found he had used the internet to acquire information about Fortuyn.

=== First hearing ===
The first "pro forma" hearing in his trial started on 9 August, which Van der Graaf watched on television from his cell in the Bijlmerbajes prison. The prosecution outlined its evidence, which included the finding of DNA matching Fortuyn on Van der Graaf's clothes and gun, matching of the bullets used in the attack with the gun, and eyewitnesses who pursued him continuously from the murder scene to the point of arrest. The defence complained that lack of discretion in reporting by the press and statements by public officials would make it difficult to obtain a fair trial. It requested calling as witnesses several politicians who had made public comments about the murder, including the past Prime Ministers Wim Kok and Jan Peter Balkenende, as well as various members of Lijst Pim Fortuyn including Mat Herben and Jim Janssen van Raaij.

On the morning of 3 September, Van der Graaf's girlfriend was arrested at her workplace in connection with the chemicals found at their former home. Her lawyer and the lawyers of Van der Graaf denounced this as an attempt to pressure Van der Graaf into making a statement. She was released two days later and eventually cleared of any suspicion after Van der Graaf made a statement on her behalf.

=== Second hearing ===
During a second "pro forma" hearing on 4 November, it was decided that the trial would be delayed while Van der Graaf was sent for seven weeks of psychiatric observation at the Pieter Baan Centre, starting in the first week of January 2003. In a press statement of 23 November, the prosecution (Public Ministry) announced that Van der Graaf had confessed to the murder. He said he planned it for some time and that nobody else was involved in the plans or knew about them. He believed Fortuyn was a steadily increasing danger for vulnerable groups in society. He saw no other possibility than to end the danger by killing Fortuyn.

In response to the confession, Mat Herben said he was still not convinced that Van der Graaf had acted alone. Fortuyn's brother Marten said he was not surprised by the confession but feared that Van der Graaf was setting himself up as "saviour of the fatherland".

The confession has not been made publicly available. Reports have asserted that Van der Graaf said he was "not proud" of the deed. He said if he could consider the decision again, he would not do it. He said that he did not see himself as "the saviour of the Netherlands" or as a martyr.

On 6 January 2003, Van der Graaf was moved to the Pieter Baan Centrum (PBC) to begin the seven-week behavioural investigation. Disagreements between the Ministry of Justice and the management of the PBC over the conditions of his supervision delayed it. The Ministry wanted Van der Graaf under video surveillance 24 hours per day and isolated from other patients for his own safety. The PBC believed such cameras would prevent establishing the trust needed for the multi-disciplinary behavioural investigation. It took responsibility to supervise him in a small group so that the investigation could proceed optimally. On 20 January, Van der Graaf said he was suspending his cooperation for the investigation. The Minister of Justice, Piet Hein Donner, resolved the dispute by dropping the demands for video surveillance and isolation.

=== Third hearing ===
On 29 January 2003, a third "pro forma" hearing was held in which the dates for the trial were set. Since the subject of the trial was expected to be not so much the question of the guilt of Van der Graaf, but instead the degree of the punishment, the report of the Pieter Baan Centrum was considered highly significant, in case it found that he was of "diminished responsibilities". After the completion of the investigation on 14 March, he was returned to his prison cell in the Bijlmerbajes.

The report from the PBC was complete by about 21 March. It found that Van der Graaf could be held completely accountable for the killing. The report also stated that Van der Graaf has a severe personality disorder, which explains his rigid moral judgements. Menno Oosterhoff, a child psychiatrist from Groningen, publicly suggested that the Pieter Baan Centrum may have overlooked the possibility that Van der Graaf has Asperger syndrome; Oosterhoff later withdrew his theory. The PBC report stated that nothing could be said about the chance of another similar crime occurring, since the disorder had nothing to do with the murder. Van der Graaf agreed that he was accountable and that he had compulsive urges. The outcome of the investigation ensured that he would receive a prison sentence and not "TBS treatment".

=== The trial ===
The trial was held in a high-security court in Amsterdam-Osdorp over three days: 27 March 31 March, and 1 April. About 15 supporters of Fortuyn demonstrated outside the building, with banners such as "for less than 20 years we will smash the place up", "better Fortuynist than socialist" and "the leftist church is criminal". The proceedings were followed by about 80 people, including a woman who disturbed the occasion by screaming at Van der Graaf, accusing him of such things as "destroying the whole of the Netherlands". Van der Graaf was counseled by the high-profile German-born attorney, Britta Böhler.

Van der Graaf was charged with the premeditated murder of Fortuyn, two counts of possession of illegal weapons, namely the gun and the explosive mixture at his house, and a charge of threatening the life of Fortuyn's chauffeur by pointing his gun at him during the chase following the murder.

The prosecutor asked for life imprisonment for the killing, saying that an example must be set for anybody else attempting to frustrate the democratic process through criminal means. He said the crime was serious because of its victim and the consequences, and that to a certain degree it was a "political murder". Van der Graaf had irrevocably damaged the democratic political progress of Fortuyn, and had done it intentionally. For an exceptional crime, he deserved an exceptional punishment.

During the trial, Van der Graaf described his reasons for killing Fortuyn. He claimed he hoped that the leaders of other political parties would criticize Fortuyn, but that it never happened (which was not true as other party leaders had openly criticized and derided Fortuyn in debates). He claimed that Fortuyn had the talent to channel criticism so that it never touched him. Van der Graaf said he had spoken to no one about his plan. He finished his planning just the day before the murder. Perhaps looking for sympathy, he said he was wrestling with regret for the killing, finding the killing of somebody morally reprehensible. On 6 May he had felt justified, saying that he wanted to fight the danger of what Fortuyn represented, not the man. He did not find it easy to talk about feelings. Asked about the danger of accidentally injuring somebody other than Fortuyn in the attack, he said that he had been confident that that would not happen. However, the 3FM disc jockey Ruud de Wild said that he barely escaped with his life, as he received a bullet in the bag used for a shield. De Wild also stated that witnessing the shooting had left him suffering from PTSD.

To the argument that Fortuyn would have been chosen through democratic means, Van der Graaf said that that was also the case for Hitler. He compared the rise of Fortuyn to the rise of Nazism in the 1930s. In his final argument, he said that he had acted from his conscience, but that did not justify murder. He said it was absolutely not normal to shoot somebody to death.

Van der Graaf said he murdered Fortuyn to defend Dutch Muslims from persecution. He wanted to stop Fortuyn from targeting "the weak parts of society to score points" and exploiting Muslims as "scapegoats" in an attempt to seek political power.

Van der Graaf said that he would not have committed the murder, at least not on that evening, if Fortuyn had been accompanied by security guards; this is relevant to accusations that the government should have provided security. On Tuesday, 15 April 2003, Van der Graaf was convicted and sentenced to 18 years' imprisonment.

=== Appeals ===
The prosecution and the defence both made appeals against the sentence. Prior to the appeal, suggestions in the media that Van der Graaf may have had Asperger syndrome were rejected by workers at the PBC. They said they had considered and rejected the possibility. A psychiatric report read in court said that Van der Graaf had an obsessive compulsive personality but was sane and could be held accountable for his actions. The prosecution argued that the court had not taken account of the political nature of the murder, and asked again for life imprisonment. The defence argued that the sentence did not take account of the harsh conditions under which Van der Graaf had been held, nor the damage that had been done by unsubstantiated allegations that had appeared in the media (such as the connection with Van der Werken), and requested a reduction in sentence to 16 years. The appeals court accepted some of the arguments from both parties, but on 18 July 2003 reiterated the sentence to 18 years' imprisonment.

== Release ==
Van der Graaf was released on parole on 2 May 2014, after having served two-thirds of his sentence as required by Dutch law. The conditions of his parole were: weekly reporting to the probation service; a ban on visiting the places of residence of relatives of the victim or the municipal areas of Rotterdam, Hilversum and The Hague; location monitoring with an ankle bracelet with GPS; a ban on contacting the relatives of Fortuyn; a ban on communicating with the media; and compulsory meetings with a psychologist or psychiatrist. He subsequently settled in Apeldoorn. A public protest against Van der Graaf's release was organised in Rotterdam by former LPF politicians including Hans Smolders and members of Fortuyn's family.

In July 2014, his lawyer Stijn Franken started legal proceedings against the terms of the parole. Van der Graaf was interested in becoming a legal advisor, and the restriction on visiting The Hague was unreasonable when so many legal organisations are based there. He also claimed that the restriction on communicating with the press was a violation of free speech, and that this and other restrictions were unnecessary when experts had found the risk of recidivism to be extremely low. He was partially successful, in that the travel restrictions and the ankle bracelet conditions were removed, but the media ban remained to "prevent unnecessary social unrest". The government appealed the judgement, but it was upheld.

In 2017, Van der Graaf faced another court case in which the public prosecutor asked that he be returned to prison for a year for failing to sufficiently answer questions at probation meetings. However, on 6 February 2017 the court found that he had sufficiently met his probation requirements by appearing at the meetings.

In 2018, Van der Graaf again took legal action against the government over the terms of his parole, saying that the parole hearings prevented him from emigrating. The court ruled in his favour, and an appeal was withdrawn after a new arrangement was made: that Van der Graaf would report by email once every two months, until April 2020. As of May 2019, he was still resident in Apeldoorn.

His parole expired on 30 April 2020, delivering him from the remaining restrictions.

== See also ==
- Left-wing terrorism
- 06/05, a movie loosely based upon Pim Fortuyn's murder
