= Carol Voges =

Dutch writer

Carol Willem Voges (Amsterdam, 19 June 1925 – Laren, North Holland 9 January 2001) was a Dutch illustrator and cartoonist.

== Biography ==
Voges started his career working for comics artist Joop Geesink. He worked at the Toonder Studios, where he drew the Tom Poes comics, and also made illustrations and comics for magazines such as Sjors, Donald Duck, Sesame Street, Bobo, Okki, Taptoe and others.

Voges was mostly active at publishing company De Eekhoorn, where he illustrated many children's novels, including Henri Arnoldus' Pietje Puk, Tup en Joep, Klik en Klak, Pim en Pidoe, Jokkie and Oki en Doki. He also illustrated Ans Arnoldus' Tillie en Tiffie series, Trix Bakker's Peter en Peet series, Willy van der Heide's Bob Evers series and Bouke Jagt's Edda en Wimmie series.

Among his best known work was the comic strip De Avonturen van Pa Pinkelman, which was published in De Volkskrant between November 11, 1945 and 1952 under script of Godfried Bomans. He also co-operated on the 1976–1977 TV adaptation of this story.

Other comics from his hand are Jimmy Brown, Sportheld nr. 1 (1949–1957), which also appeared in De Volkskrant.

He also illustrated covers for sheet music.
