= Pim Fortuyn =

Dutch politician (1948–2002)

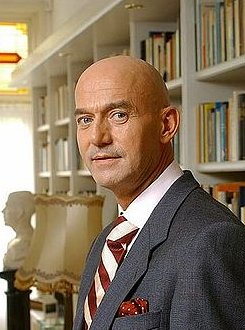
- Fortuyn on 4 May 2002, two days before his assassination
- Born: Wilhelmus Simon Petrus Fortuijn; 19 February 1948; Velsen, Netherlands
- Died: 6 May 2002 (aged 54); Hilversum, Netherlands
- Cause of death: Assassination (gunshot wounds)
- Resting place: San Giorgio della Richinvelda, Italy
- Other name: Pim Fortuijn
- Education: VU Amsterdam (Bachelor of Social Science, Master of Social Science); University of Groningen (PhD)
- Occupations: Politician · civil servant · Sociologist; Corporate director · Political consultant · Political pundit · Author · Columnist · Publisher · Teacher · professor
- Political party: Labour Party (1974–1989); People's Party for Freedom and Democracy (mid 1990s); Livable Netherlands (2001–2002); Livable Rotterdam (2001–2002); Pim Fortuyn List (2002)

Municipal Councilor in Rotterdam
- In office 6 March 2002 – 6 May 2002
- Succeeded by: Dries Mosch

Signature
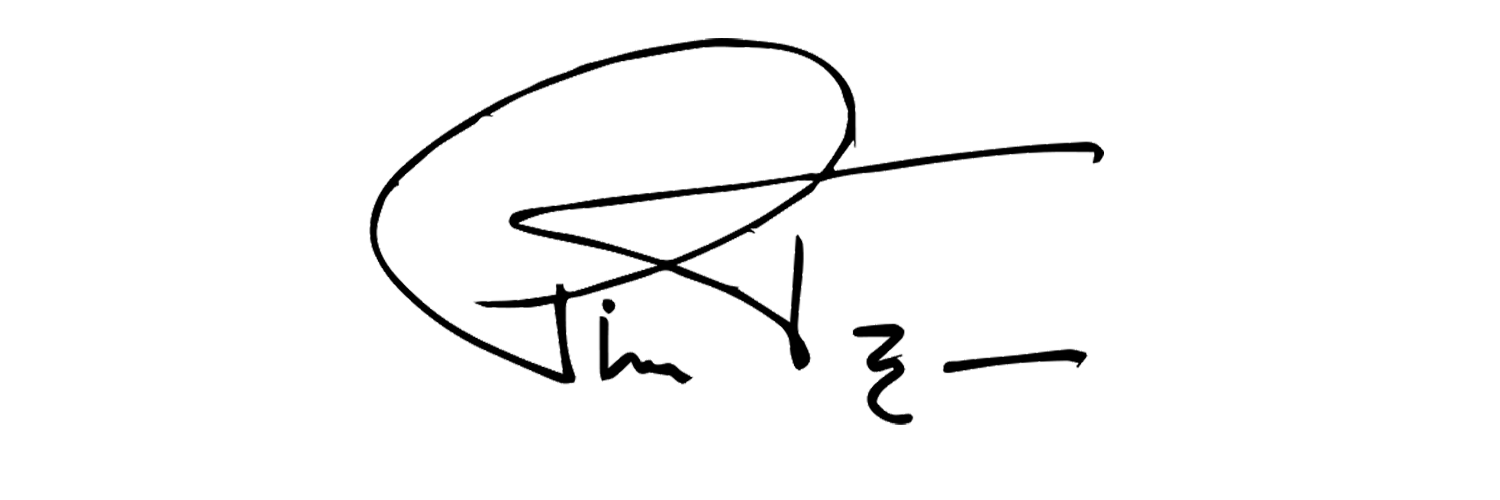

Wilhelmus Simon Petrus Fortuijn, known as Pim Fortuyn (Dutch: [ˈpɪɱ fɔrˈtœyn]; 19 February 1948 – 6 May 2002) was a Dutch politician, author, civil servant, businessman, sociologist, and academic who founded the party Pim Fortuyn List (Lijst Pim Fortuyn or LPF) in 2002.

Fortuyn worked as an extraordinary professor at the Erasmus University of Rotterdam until 1995 after which he went for a business career and was an advisor to the Dutch government on social infrastructure. He then became prominent in the Netherlands as a press columnist, writer and media commentator.

Initially a Marxist who was sympathetic to the Communist Party of the Netherlands, and later a member of the Dutch Labour Party in the 1970s, Fortuyn's beliefs began to shift to the right in the 1990s, especially related to the immigration policies of the Netherlands. Fortuyn criticised multiculturalism, immigration and Islam in the Netherlands. He called Islam "a backward culture" and was quoted as saying that if it were legally possible, he would close the borders for Muslim immigrants. Fortuyn also supported tougher measures against crime and opposed state bureaucracy, wanting to reduce the Dutch financial contribution to the European Union. He was labelled a far-right populist by his opponents and in the media, but he fiercely rejected this label. Fortuyn was openly gay and a supporter of gay rights.

Fortuyn explicitly distanced himself from "far-right" politicians such as the Belgian Filip Dewinter, Austrian Jörg Haider, or Frenchman Jean-Marie Le Pen whenever compared to them. While he compared his own politics to centre-right politicians such as Silvio Berlusconi of Italy and Edmund Stoiber of Germany, he also admired former Dutch Prime Minister Joop den Uyl, a social democrat, and Democratic U.S. president John F. Kennedy. Fortuyn also criticised the polder model and the policies of the outgoing government of Wim Kok and repeatedly described himself and LPF's ideology as pragmatic and not populistic. He also became known for his unconventional and flamboyant way of debating which was considered unique in Dutch politics at the time. In March 2002, his newly created LPF became the largest party in Fortuyn's hometown Rotterdam during the Dutch municipal elections held that year.

Fortuyn was assassinated during the 2002 Dutch national election campaign by Volkert van der Graaf, a left-wing environmentalist and animal rights activist. In court at his trial, Van der Graaf said he murdered Fortuyn to stop him from exploiting Muslims as "scapegoats" and targeting "the weak members of society" in seeking political power. The LPF went on to poll in second place during the election but went into decline soon after before it was ultimately disbanded at a national level in 2008. Despite this, Fortuyn's ideas and legacy continued to have an impact upon Dutch politics. Observers have described his ideological influence as Fortuynism or the Fortuyn revolt.

== Biography ==
=== Early life and education ===
Wilhelmus Simon Petrus Fortuijn was born on 19 February 1948 in Driehuis within the Dutch municipality of Velsen, as the third child to a middle class Catholic family. His father was a sales representative for an envelopes and paper company and was involved in local Catholic associations, while his mother was a housewife. Fortuyn was raised primarily by his mother, as his father was often away for his work. He first attended a Catholic primary school, where Fortuyn later described his time as "terrible," before graduating from the Mendelcollege secondary school in Haarlem where he was described as an academically gifted pupil.

As a youth, Fortuyn initially wanted to train as a priest, but in 1967 he began to study sociology at the University of Amsterdam and also attended lectures in history, economics and law. He then transferred after a few months to the Vrije Universiteit in Amsterdam, where he continued his degree in sociology and took joint honours classes in public administration. In 1971 he ended his study with the Academic degree Doctorandus. In 1981 he received a doctorate in sociology at the University of Groningen as a Doctor of Philosophy.

=== Career ===
==== Professional career ====
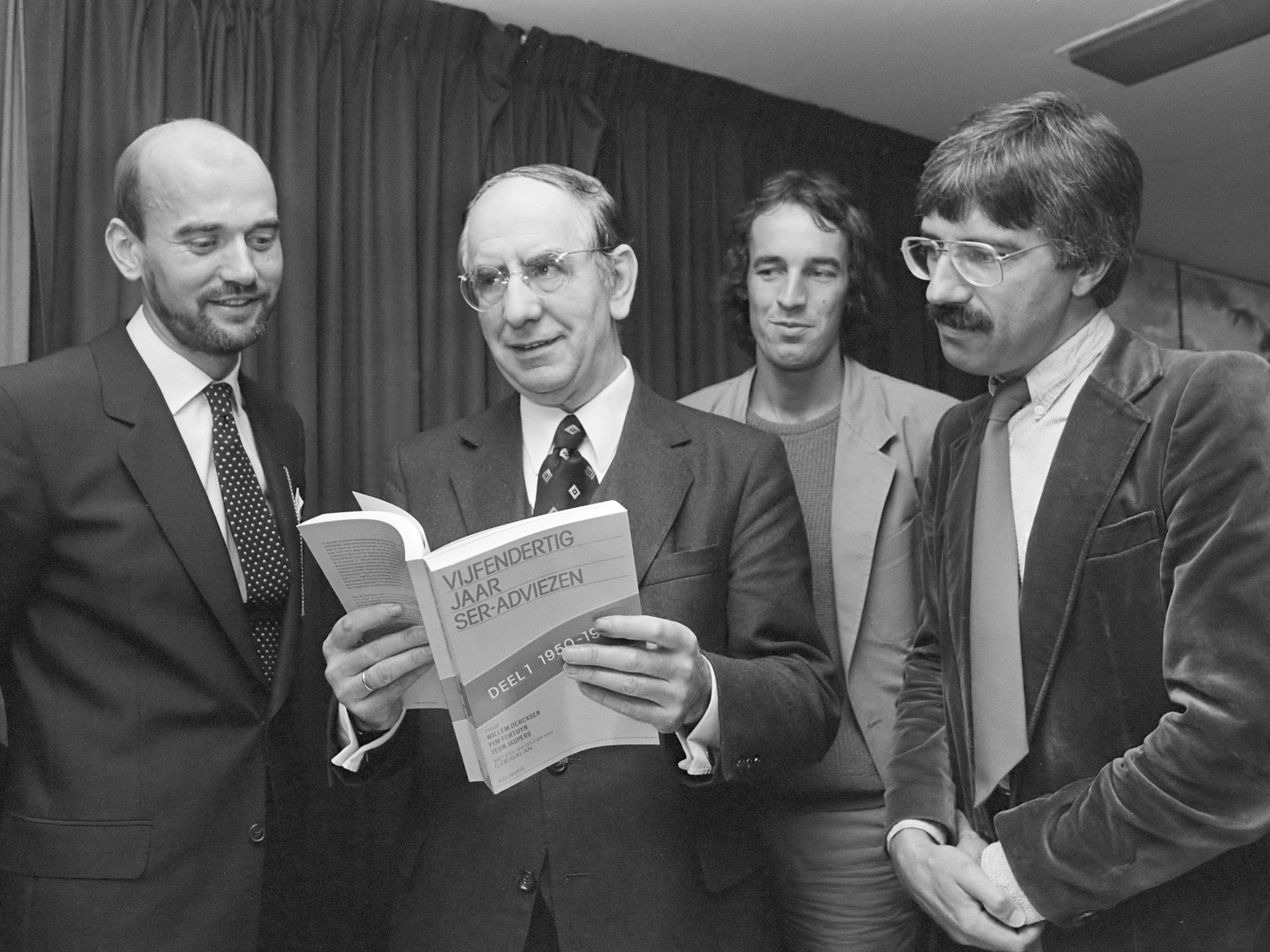
Pim Fortuyn with Jan Willem de Pous at a presentation of Thirty-Five Years of SER recommendations (1982)

Fortuyn worked as a lecturer at the Nyenrode Business Universiteit and as an associate professor at the University of Groningen, where he taught Marxist sociology. He was also an employee of the Groningen University Newspaper for which he wrote columns. He was a Marxist at the time and sympathized with the Communist Party of the Netherlands (CPN), although he never became a full member. Later, he joined the Labour Party. In 1989 Fortuyn became director of a government organisation administering student transport cards and worked as a research assistant and advisor to the Social and Economic Council (SER). In 1990 he moved to Rotterdam. From 1991 to 1995, he was an extraordinary professor at the Erasmus University Rotterdam, appointed to the Albeda-chair in "employment conditions in public service" and ran an education consultancy business.

When his teaching contract in Rotterdam ended, Fortuyn made a career of public speaking, writing books and press columns, and worked as a weekly columnist for Elsevier. He gradually involved himself in politics through regularly appearing on televised debate shows and became a familiar public figure for his charismatic and flamboyant speaking style. In 1994 he began hosting his own radio program on RTV Rijnmond and often appeared on the political debate show Buitenhof and later as a commentator on the business current affairs program Business Class on RTL Nederland. Fortuyn was openly gay, and said in a 2002 interview that he was Catholic.

==== Political career ====
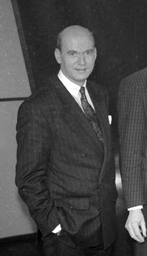
Pim Fortuyn in 1991

Fortuyn began his political career on the left and was initially a Marxist due to an aversion to the Dutch political establishment which he described as dominated by pillarization and a "regent mentality." He was sympathetic to the Dutch Communist Party but chose not to become a member due to personal disagreements with the party leadership and self-identified as a Marxist without becoming active in any communist organisations. In the 1970s he joined the Labour Party and became a social democrat. In 1986, his views shifted towards neoliberalism in the hope that the free market would lead to further individual emancipation, ending a perceived oppression by state bureaucracy. In 1991, he proposed firing half of all civil servants and promoted privatisation and decentralisation. In 1992, Fortuyn wrote Aan het volk van Nederland ("To the people of the Netherlands"), in which he declared himself to be the spiritual successor of the charismatic but controversial 18th-century Dutch patriot politician Joan Derk van der Capellen tot den Pol. The book urges the already culturally emancipated citizen to use the free market to also liberate himself economically, from the welfare state. In 1989, Fortuyn left the Labour Party and during the 1990s became a member of the centre-right VVD and was briefly a political consultant to the Christian Democratic Appeal in the early 2000s.

Though on economic matters Fortuyn would largely remain a neoliberal, culturally he soon became strongly influenced by the neoconservative political philosopher and chief editor of the weekly Elsevier Hendrik Jan Schoo who made him a columnist in 1993. Schoo deplored that a progressive new class would have promoted multiculturalism, founding an anti-racist civil religion on article 1 of the Dutch constitution, forbidding discrimination. Whereas in the early 1990s Fortuyn had held liberal views on immigration, this changed under the influence of Schoo.

Dutch neocons understood that in the evermore secularising Netherlands a change on the lines of the Reagan Revolution had become highly improbable. Women's rights, gay rights, abortion and euthanasia had been generally accepted. In his 1995 book De verweesde samenleving ("The orphaned society"), Fortuyn claimed that the progressive movement of the 1960s had eroded traditional norms and values. Both the roles of the "symbolic father" and the "caring mother" had been lost, leaving an orphaned population without guidance, to live out a meaningless decadent existence. However, Fortuyn did not propose a return to old socially conservative or Dutch Calvinist and iconoclastic values and argued that the media, schools and artists should provide a moral leadership, explicitly promoting and defending the new values of modern Western society, constantly recreating the Dutch identity. Fortuyn consistently retained a liberal stance on matters such as LGBT rights throughout his political career.

Adopting the philosophical analysis by Carl Schmitt, it was assumed that such an identity could only be defined in antithesis to some actually existing concrete enemy. Inspired by Samuel Huntington's The Clash of Civilizations, Dutch ethnicity was to be re-invented by identifying that enemy as Islam. In his 1997 book Tegen de islamisering van onze cultuur ("Against the islamisation of our culture"), Fortuyn proposed that after the fall of communism a new adversary would be found in Muslim culture. Fortuyn explained the global fundamentalist wave of the 1990s as a backlash against the insecurities caused by globalisation. The Dutch should counter Islamic fundamentalism by promoting and defending their own fundament, Dutch culture, especially modernism and the Enlightenment values. These should not yet be imposed on the Dutch population as a whole, with the exception of immigrants. Whereas American neoconservatives promoted hard power policies in relation to the Muslim world, Dutch neocons favoured a soft power approach. Shortly before the September 11 attacks, Fortuyn called for a Cold War against Islam, meaning a non-military defensive enmity. The attacks and the war on terror made Islam a main issue in Dutch politics for the first time.

Fortuyn announced his intention to run for parliament in a television interview with EenVandaag in 2001, although he did not specify which party he would seek to stand as a candidate with. Although he was already in contact with the newly formed Livable Netherlands (LN) party, he also considered running for the Christian Democratic Appeal which he had worked as a consultant for, or even creating his own list. Livable Netherlands founder Jan Nagel subsequently invited him to run as party leader and Fortuyn was elected "lijsttrekker" (lead candidate) by a large majority of party members at the LN conference on 26 November 2001, prior to the Dutch general election of 2002. In his leadership bid and general election campaign, Fortuyn attacked the mainstream parties on multiculturalism, immigration and law & order. He also called for less government interference and for a reform of the Dutch public health and education systems. Fortuyn concluded his speech by stating "at your service" in English which he later adopted as his campaign slogan during the general election. Support for LN rose dramatically during Fortuyn's brief leadership, climbing from 2% in opinion polls to about 17%.

On 9 February 2002, Fortuyn gave an interview to Volkskrant, a Dutch newspaper (see below) regarding his beliefs on immigration and Islam. His statements were considered so controversial that the LN summoned him to an emergency meeting and then dismissed him as lijsttrekker the next day after Fortuyn refused to retract his statements. Against the advice of his campaign team, Fortuyn said in the interview that he favoured closing borders to Muslim immigrants and if possible he would abolish the "peculiar article" of the Dutch constitution forbidding discrimination (at the time it was generally assumed that he referred to Article 1, the equality before the law; it has been argued, however, that Fortuyn and the interviewer had confused this with Article 137 of the Penal Code, incitement to hatred).

===== Founding the LPF =====
Having been rejected by Livable Netherlands, Fortuyn founded his own party Pim Fortuyn List (LPF) on 14 February 2002, taking many former LN members and supporters with him. Heading the list of the Livable Rotterdam party, considered to be the local counterpart of the LPF, he achieved a major victory in the Rotterdam municipal council elections in early March 2002 where Fortuyn was elected to Rotterdam's municipal council. The new party won about 36% of the seats, making it the largest party in the council. For the first time since the Second World War, the Labour Party was out of power in Rotterdam.

Fortuyn's victory made him the subject of hundreds of interviews during the next three months, and he made many statements about his political ideology. In March he released his book The Mess of Eight Purple Years (De puinhopen van acht jaar Paars), which criticised the current political system in the Netherlands and was used as his political agenda for the upcoming general election. Purple is the colour to indicate a coalition government consisting of left parties (red) and conservative-liberal parties (blue). The Netherlands had been governed by such a coalition for eight years at that time.

On 14 March 2002, Fortuyn was pied by a left-wing activist from the Biotic Baking Brigade in The Hague. The incident sparked a debate about Fortuyn's security. Fortuyn also received anonymous letters and phone calls containing death threats during the election campaign. As a result, Fortuyn began to express a fear of being injured or assassinated and accused members of the Dutch political establishment of encouraging violence against him. He described Dutch society as tolerant in appearance, not in reality.

== Death ==
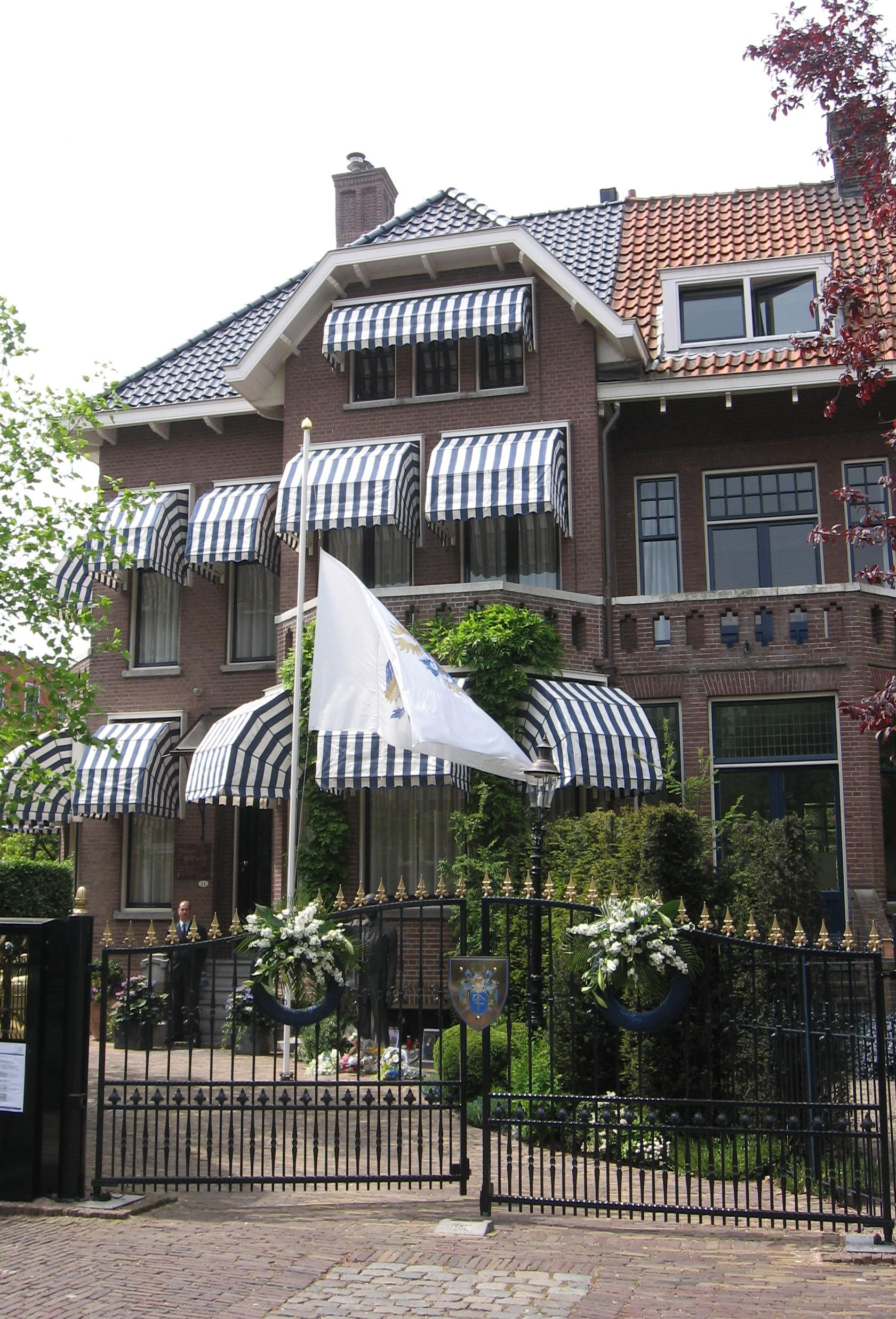
Fortuyn's house in Rotterdam where he lived from 1998 until his death

On 6 May 2002, at age 54, Fortuyn was assassinated by gunshot in Hilversum, North Holland, by Volkert van der Graaf. The attack took place in a car park outside a radio studio where Fortuyn had just given an interview. This was nine days before the general election, in which he was running. The attacker was pursued by Hans Smolders, Fortuyn's driver, and was arrested by the police shortly afterward, still in possession of a handgun. Months later, Van der Graaf confessed in court to the first notable political assassination in the Netherlands since 1672 (excluding World War II). On 15 April 2003, he was convicted of assassinating Fortuyn and sentenced to 18 years in prison. He was released on parole in May 2014 after serving two-thirds of his sentence, the standard procedure under the Dutch penal system.

The assassination shocked many residents of the Netherlands and highlighted the cultural clashes within the country. Various conspiracy theories arose after Pim Fortuyn's murder and deeply affected Dutch politics and society. Politicians from all parties suspended campaigning. After consultation with LPF, the government decided not to postpone the elections. As Dutch law did not permit modifying the ballots, Fortuyn became a posthumous candidate. The LPF made an unprecedented debut in the House of Representatives by winning 26 seats (17% of the 150 seats in the house). The LPF joined a cabinet with the Christian Democratic Appeal and the People's Party for Freedom and Democracy, but conflicts in the rudderless LPF quickly collapsed the cabinet, forcing new elections. By the following year, the party had lost support, winning only eight seats in the 2003 elections. It won no seats in the 2006 elections, by which time the Party for Freedom, led by Geert Wilders, had emerged as a successor.

During the last months of his life, Fortuyn had become closer to the Catholic Church. To the surprise of many commentators and Dutch TV hosts, Fortuyn insisted on Fr. Louis Berger, a parish priest from The Hague, accompanying him in some of his last TV appearances. According to The New York Times, Berger had become his "friend and confessor" during the last weeks of his life.

=== Burial ===
Fortuyn was initially buried in Driehuis in the Netherlands. He was re-interred on 20 July 2002, at San Giorgio della Richinvelda, in the province of Pordenone in Italy, where he had owned a house.

== Views ==
=== Islam and immigration ===
Fortuyn was critical of Islamic culture and argued that gradual Islamization was occurring in Dutch society as a consequence of immigration and multicultural policies in the Netherlands. When asked about his opposition to Muslim immigration, Fortuyn explained that, "I have no desire to go through the emancipation of women and homosexuals all over again." In August 2001, Fortuyn was quoted in the Rotterdams Dagblad newspaper saying, "I am also in favour of a cold war with Islam. I see Islam as an extraordinary threat, as a hostile religion." In the TV program Business Class, Fortuyn said that Muslims in the Netherlands did not accept Dutch society; he believed that the religion of Islam was fundamentally intolerant and incompatible with Western values. He said that Muslims in the Netherlands needed to accept living together with the Dutch, and that if this was unacceptable for them, then they were free to leave. His concluding words in the TV program were "... I want to live together with the Muslim people, but it takes two to tango." Fortuyn also strongly maintained that he did not object to Muslim immigrants because of their race or ethnicity, and was not against a multiracial society, but opposed what he saw as lack of integration and unwillingness to adapt to Dutch standards of modernity and social liberalism within Muslim communities.

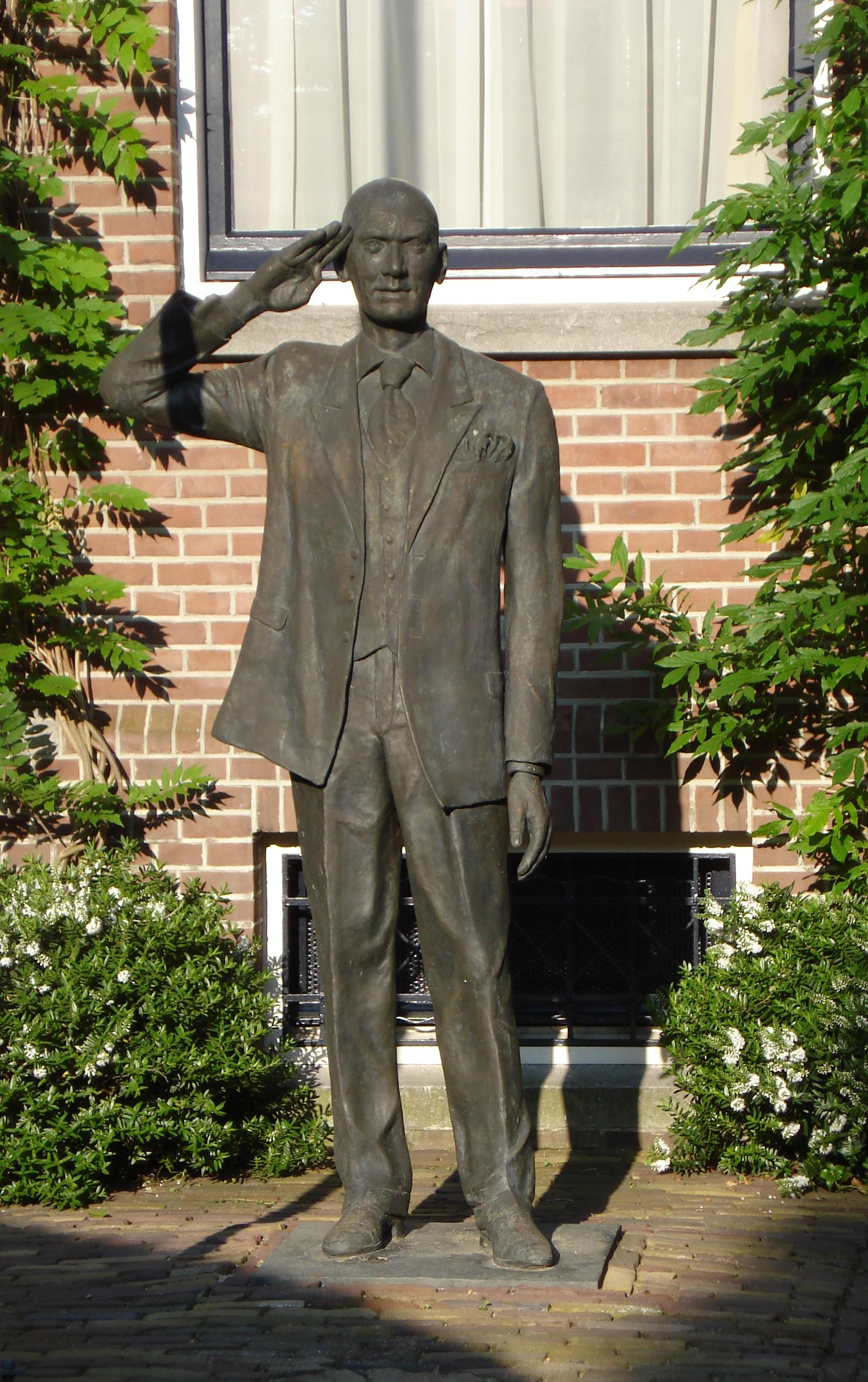
After his death a statue was placed at his home in Rotterdam. The statue has since been removed from the property and auctioned off

On 9 February 2002, additional statements made by him were carried in an interview with Volkskrant during his leadership of the Livable Netherlands party. Fortuyn argued that Islamic culture would deem him "less than a pig" for being a Christian and a homosexual. He said that the Netherlands, with a population of 16 million, had enough inhabitants, and the practice of allowing as many as 40,000 asylum-seekers into the country each year had to be stopped. The actual number for 2001 was 27,000, down slightly on the previous year. Fortuyn also argued that he would not allow any more Muslim immigrants into the Netherlands if it were legally possible. He claimed that if he became part of the next government, he would pursue a restrictive immigration policy while also granting citizenship to a large group of illegal immigrants, saying that he did not intend to "unload our Moroccan hooligans" onto the Moroccan King Hassan. Hassan had died three years earlier. He considered Article 7 of the constitution, which asserts freedom of speech, of more importance than Article 1, which forbids discrimination on the basis of religion, life principles, political inclination, race, or sexual preference. Fortuyn also distanced himself from Hans Janmaat of the Centrum Democraten, who in the 1980s wanted to remove all foreigners from the country and was repeatedly convicted for discrimination and hate speech.

Fortuyn proposed that all people who already resided in the Netherlands would be allowed to stay, provided the immigrants adopted the Dutch society's consensus on human rights as their own. He stated: "not integrating means leaving" and "the borders have to be hermetically closed". He said "If it were legally possible, I'd say no more Muslims will get in here", claiming that the influx of Muslims would threaten freedoms in the liberal Dutch society. He thought Muslim culture had never undergone a process of modernisation and therefore still lacked acceptance of democracy and women's, gays', lesbians' and minorities' rights.

When asked by the Dutch newspaper Volkskrant whether he hated Islam, he replied (translated from Dutch):

I don't hate Islam. I consider it a backward culture. I have travelled much in the world. And wherever Islam rules, it's just terrible. All the hypocrisy. It's a bit like those old Reformed Protestants. The Reformed lie all the time. And why is that? Because they have standards and values that are so high that you can't humanly maintain them. You also see that in that Muslim culture. Then look at the Netherlands. In what country could an electoral leader of such a large movement as mine be openly homosexual? How wonderful that that's possible. That's something that one can be proud of. And I'd like to keep it that way, thank you very much. (Note: Original quote in Dutch: "Ik haat de islam niet. Ik vind het een achterlijke cultuur. Ik heb veel gereisd in de wereld. En overal waar de islam de baas is, is het gewoon verschrikkelijk. Al die dubbelzinnigheid. Het heeft wel iets weg van die oude gereformeerden. Gereformeerden liegen altijd. En hoe komt dat? Omdat ze een normen- en waardenstelsel hebben dat zo hoog ligt dat je dat menselijkerwijs niet kunt handhaven. Dat zie je in die moslimcultuur ook. Kijk dan naar Nederland. In welk land zou een lijsttrekker van een zo grote beweging als de mijne, openlijk homoseksueel kunnen zijn? Wat fantastisch dat dat kan. Daar mag je trots op zijn. En dat wil ik graag effe zo houden".)

Fortuyn used the word achterlijk, literally meaning "backward", but commonly used as an insult in the sense of "retarded". After his use of "achterlijk" caused an uproar, Fortuyn said he had used the word with its literal meaning of "backward".

Fortuyn wrote Against the Islamization of Our Culture (1997) (in Dutch).

During its brief time in government, Fortuyn's party the LPF attempted to introduce a new proposal on immigration under LPF minister Hilbrand Nawijn called the One-Off Regulation 2003 which would grant a general pardon to asylum seekers who had been in the Netherlands for more than five years combined with a temporary freeze on migration and new restrictions on further immigration.

=== Fortuynism ===
The ideology or political style that is derived from Pim Fortuyn, and in turn the LPF, is often called Fortuynism. Observers variously saw him as a political protest targeting the alleged elitism and bureaucratic style of the Dutch purple coalitions or as offering an appealing political style. The style was characterized variously as one "of openness, directness and clearness", populism or simply as charisma. Another school holds Fortuynism as a distinct ideology, with an alternative vision of society. Some argued that Fortuynism was not just one ideology, but contained liberalism, populism and nationalism.

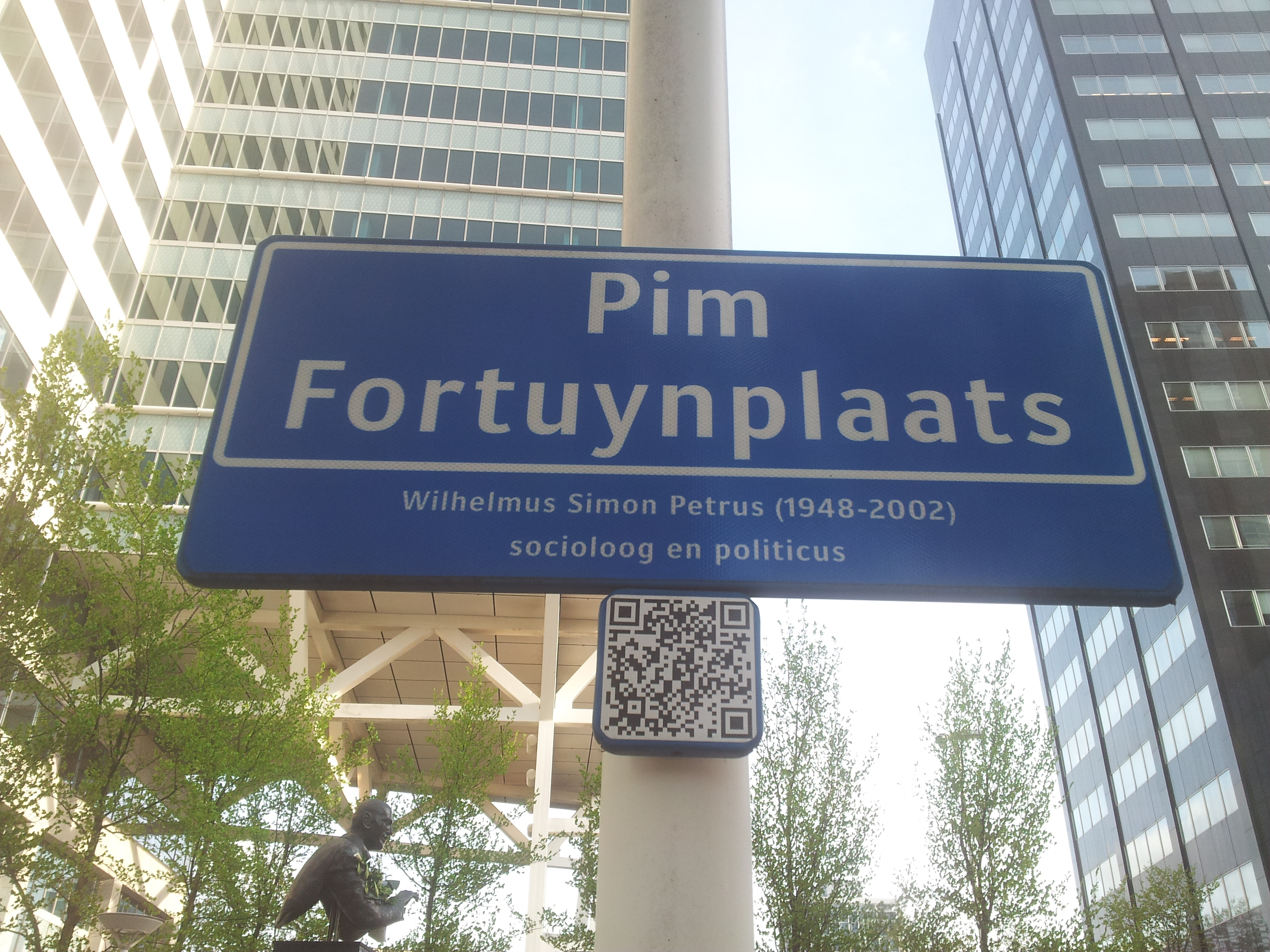
Pim Fortuynplaats square in Rotterdam which was named after Fortuyn

During the 2002 campaign, Fortuyn was accused by some of being on the "extreme right", although others saw only certain similarities. While he employed anti-immigration rhetoric, he considered himself neither a radical nationalist nor a defender of traditional authoritarian values. Fortuyn stated that he did not view himself as a far-right politician, nor as a libertarian populist, and disputed these labels when they were employed by the press to describe him. On the contrary, Fortuyn claimed he wanted to protect the socio-culturally liberal values of the Netherlands, women's rights and sexual minorities (he was openly gay himself), from the "backward" Islamic culture. He held liberal views favouring the drug policy of the Netherlands, same-sex marriage, euthanasia, and related positions. Fortuyn was also a member of the Republican Society, and favoured a system with an elected president, elected mayors and police commissioners. He also expressed support for the state of Israel throughout his political career.

The LPF also won support from some ethnic minorities; one of Fortuyn's closest associates was of Cape Verdean origin, and one of the party's MPs was a young woman of Turkish descent.

His ideology comprised the following positions:

- Civil liberties
- Classical liberalism
- Criticism of Islam
- Deregulation
- Direct democracy
- Euroscepticism
- Freedom of speech
- Laissez-faire
- LGBT rights
- Republicanism
- Secularism
- Separation of church and state
- Small government
- Women's rights

== Criticism ==
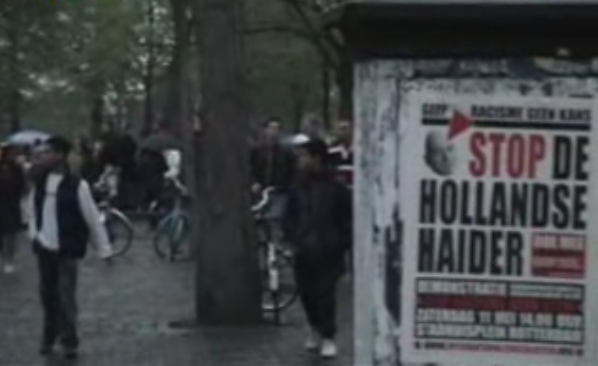
Anti-Fortuyn poster of the International Socialists with the slogan "Stop de Hollandse Haider" (English: "Stop the Dutch Haider") near Fortuyn's house in Rotterdam on 6 May 2002

Fortuyn was compared with the politicians Jörg Haider and Jean-Marie Le Pen in the foreign press. These comparisons were often referred to by Dutch reporters and politicians. An explicit comparison with Le Pen was made by Ad Melkert, then lijsttrekker of the Labour Party, who said in Emmen on 24 April 2002: "If you flirt with Fortuyn, then in the Netherlands the same thing will happen as happened in France. There they woke up with Le Pen, soon we will wake up with Fortuyn."

On 5 May, the day before the assassination, Fortuyn in a debate with Melkert organized by the Algemeen Dagblad newspaper claimed that he was demonized. In it he said that he often had to tell journalists that the image created of him in the media was incorrect.

Columnist Jan Blokker wrote that "[a]fter reading [...] I realized once again that Professor Pim may really be called the Jean-Marie Le Pen, the Filip Dewinter, the Jörg Haider and the new Hans Janmaat of the Netherlands." Prime Minister Wim Kok accused Fortuyn of stirring up fear and stimulating xenophobia among the Dutch people. In the run-up to the 2002 election, GroenLinks leader Paul Rosenmöller claimed Fortuyn's policies were "not just right but extreme right".

Fortuyn often responded to criticism by maintaining that his views were misunderstood or distorted by the media, and in turn rejected comparisons and expressed personal distaste for radical far-right politicians in other European countries. He explicitly distanced himself from Jean-Marie Le Pen and criticised some of his policies, including Le Pen's downplaying of the Holocaust. During an interview with BBC News journalist Kirsty Lang, Fortuyn stated that his opposition to Muslim immigration was mistakenly demonized as racism by journalists and his opponents, and instead argued that it was based on his desire to preserve Dutch tolerance towards sexual minorities and women and to prevent cultural clashes within Western society. In domestic politics, Fortuyn also distanced his views from hard-right Dutch politicians such as Hans Janmaat and Joop Glimmerveen (who called for the mass expulsion of foreigners from the Netherlands) by maintaining that if he came to power, he would pardon existing illegal immigrants if they had lived in the Netherlands for over five years and offer them a path to citizenship if they could be assimilated into society.

In an interview on the Dutch talk show Jensen! that was broadcast shortly before his death, Fortuyn accused members of the Dutch government and political establishment of putting his life in danger through repeatedly demonizing him and his beliefs.

== Legacy ==
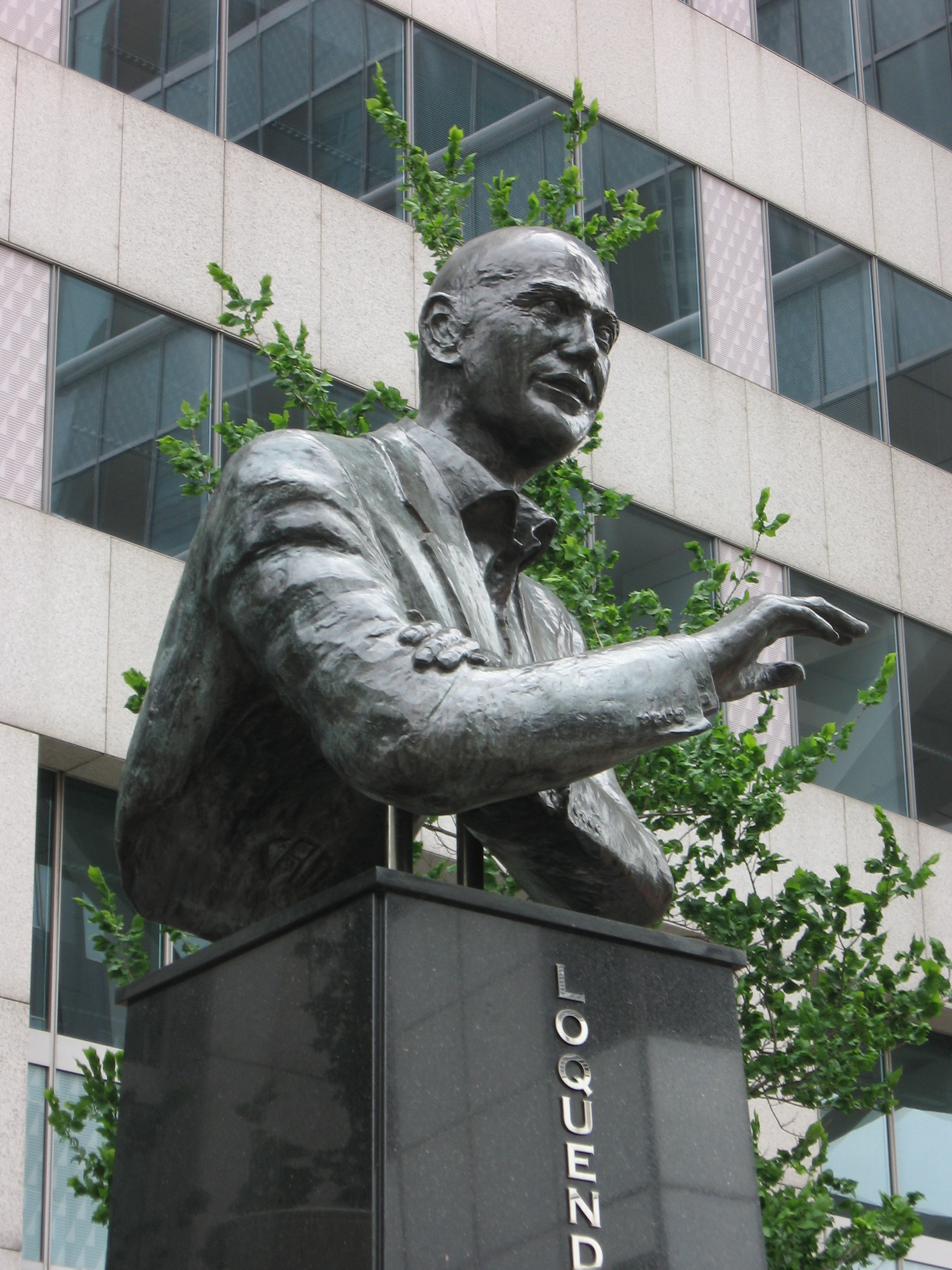
Pim Fortuyn monument in Rotterdam

Fortuyn changed the Dutch political landscape. The 2002 elections, only weeks after Fortuyn's death, were marked by large losses for the liberal People's Party for Freedom and Democracy and especially the social democratic Labour Party (whose parliamentary group was halved in size); both parties replaced their leaders shortly after their losses. The election winners were the Pim Fortuyn List, and the Christian democratic Christian Democratic Appeal (CDA) whose leader Jan Peter Balkenende went on to become prime minister. Some commentators in the mainstream political class speculated that Fortuyn's perceived martyrdom created greater support for the LPF, hence that party's brief surge to 17% of the electoral vote and 26 of the 150 seats in the Dutch Parliament. Others opined that voters who would have otherwise supported the LPF had Fortuyn not been murdered voted for the CDA as Balkenende had not joined in with other party leaders in attacking Fortuyn. Balkenende later claimed to have shared some of Fortuyn's opinions and pledged to implement some of his policy ideas. Although the LPF was able to form a coalition with the Christian Democratic Appeal and the People's Party for Freedom and Democracy, it was bereft with internal strife and quickly lost steam. The coalition cabinet of Jan Peter Balkenende fell within three months, due to infighting within the LPF. In the following elections, the LPF was left with only eight seats in parliament (out of 150) and was not included in the new government. Many of the LPF's successive leaders were not regarded as charismatic as Fortuyn and as the next cabinet under Balkenende continued many of the former coalition's policies, it became harder for the LPF to present an alternative image to the government. However, political commentators speculated that discontented voters might vote for a non-traditional party, if a viable alternative was at hand. Later, the right-wing Party for Freedom led by Geert Wilders, which has a strong stance on immigration and cultural integration, proposing to deport criminal, unemployed or not assimilated non-western immigrants, won nine (out of 150) seats in the 2006 elections and became the largest party in the 2023 elections, reaching 37 seats.

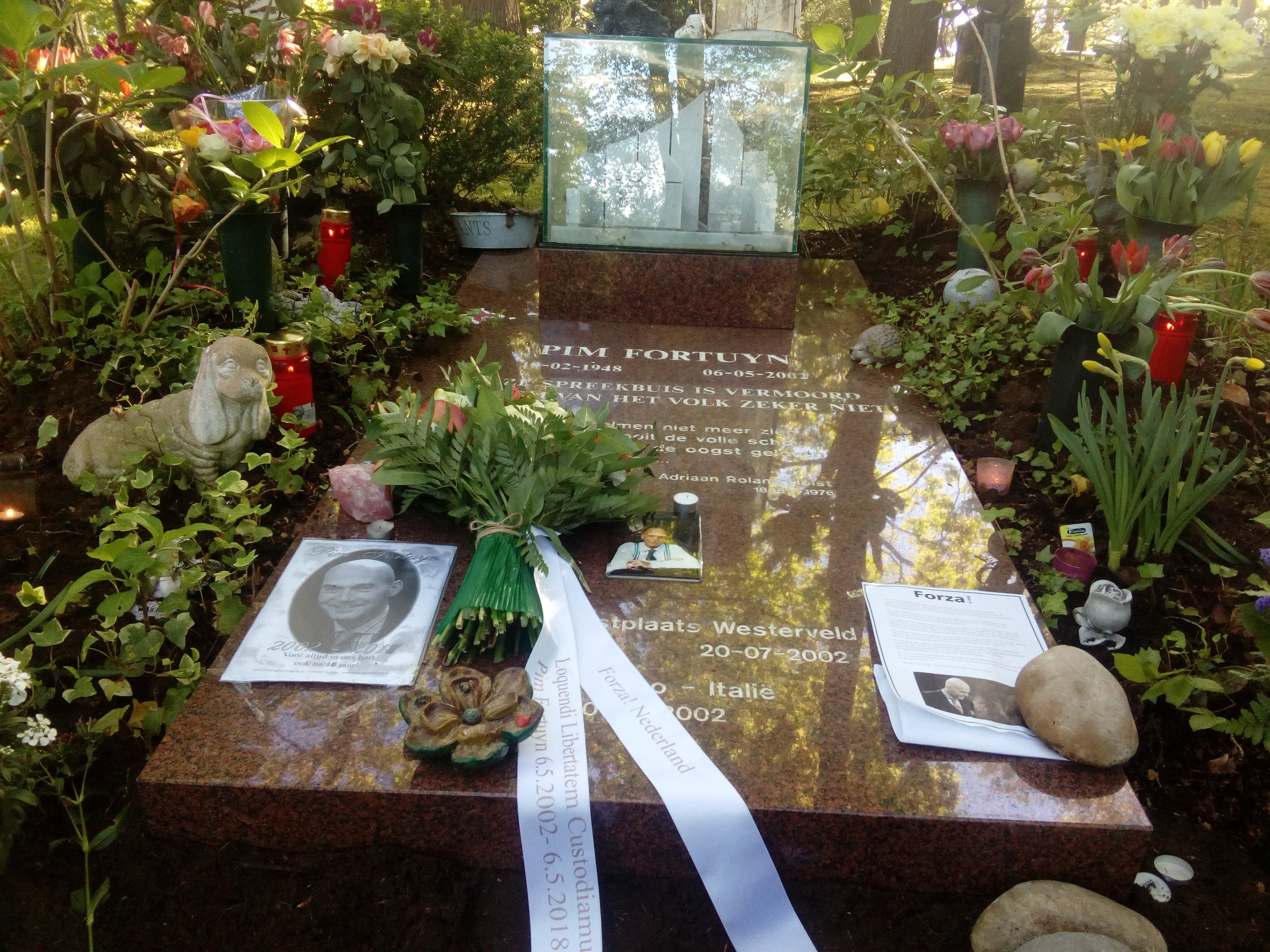
The temporary grave of Pim Fortuyn in Driehuis

The Netherlands has made its asylum policy more strict. Opponents of Fortuynism, such as Paul Rosenmöller, Thom de Graaf, and Ad Melkert (all labelling Fortuyn as a right-wing extremist), have objected to what they think is a harsher political and social climate, especially towards immigrants and Muslims.

However, other commentators such as Ayaan Hirsi Ali, David Starkey and Douglas Murray have retrospectively defended some of Fortuyn's beliefs. Former Dutch Prime Minister Jan Peter Balkenende also stated that he later agreed with some of Fortuyn's criticisms of multiculturalism and the purple coalition under Wim Kok.

Contemporary Dutch politics is more polarized than it has been in recent years, especially on the issues for which Fortuyn was best known. People debate the success of their multicultural society, and whether they need to better assimilate newcomers. The government's decision in 2004 to more strictly expel asylum seekers whose applications had failed was controversial. Fortuyn had advocated for a one-time amnesty for those asylum seekers who had resided in the Netherlands for an extended period.

In 2004, in a TV show, Fortuyn was chosen as De Grootste Nederlander ("Greatest Dutchman of all-time"), followed closely by William of Orange, the leader of the independence war that established the precursor to the present-day Netherlands. The election was not considered representative, as it was held by viewers' voting through the internet and by phoning in. Theo van Gogh had been murdered a few days before by a Muslim, which likely affected people's voting in the TV contest for Fortuyn. The program later revealed that William of Orange had received the most votes, but many could not be counted until after the official closing time of the television show (and the proclamation of the winner), due to technical problems. The official rules of the show said that votes counted before the end of the show would be decisive, but it was suggested that all votes correctly cast before the closing of the vote would be counted. Following the official rules, the outcome was not changed.

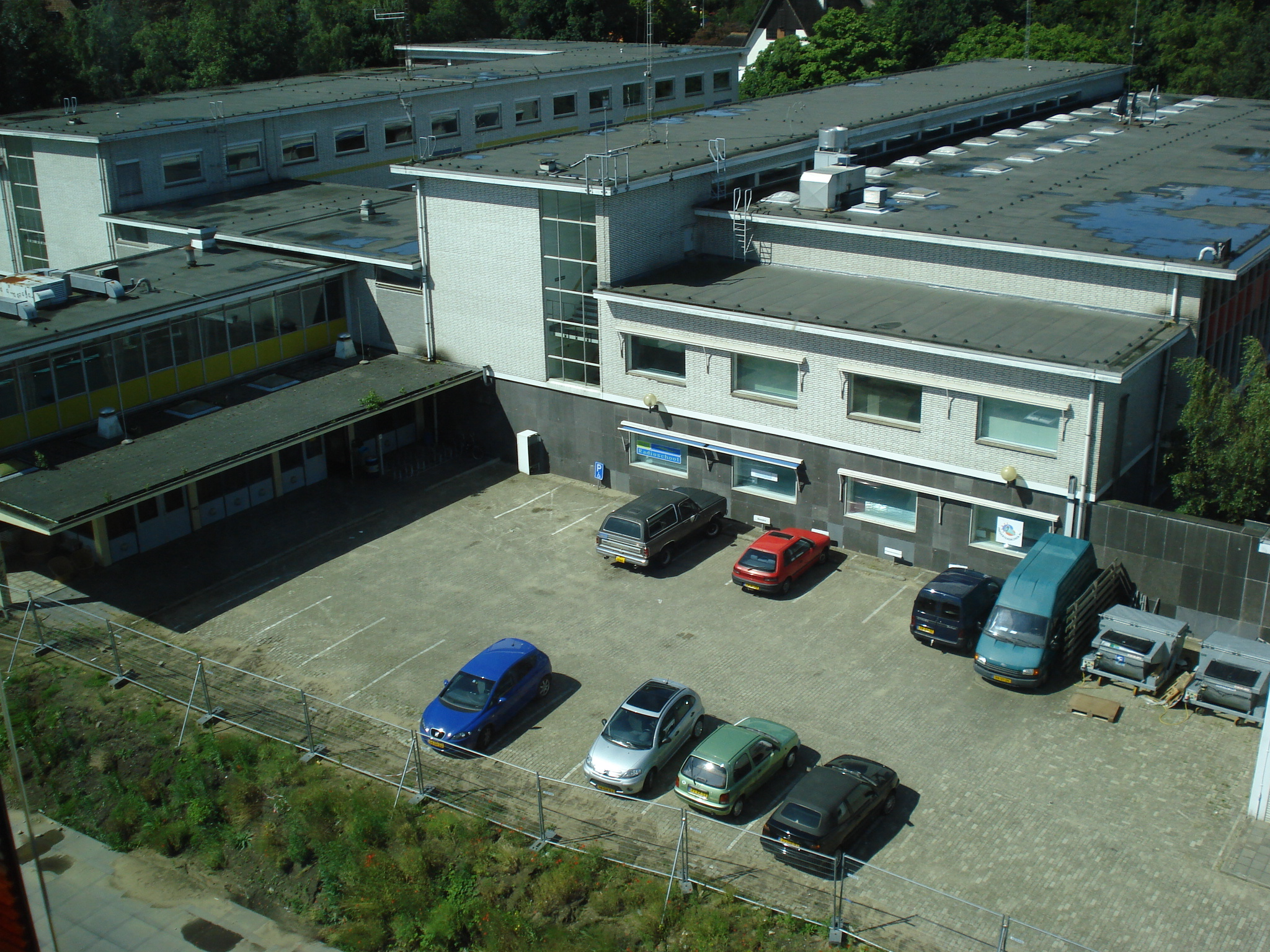
Car park in Hilversum where Fortuyn was assassinated

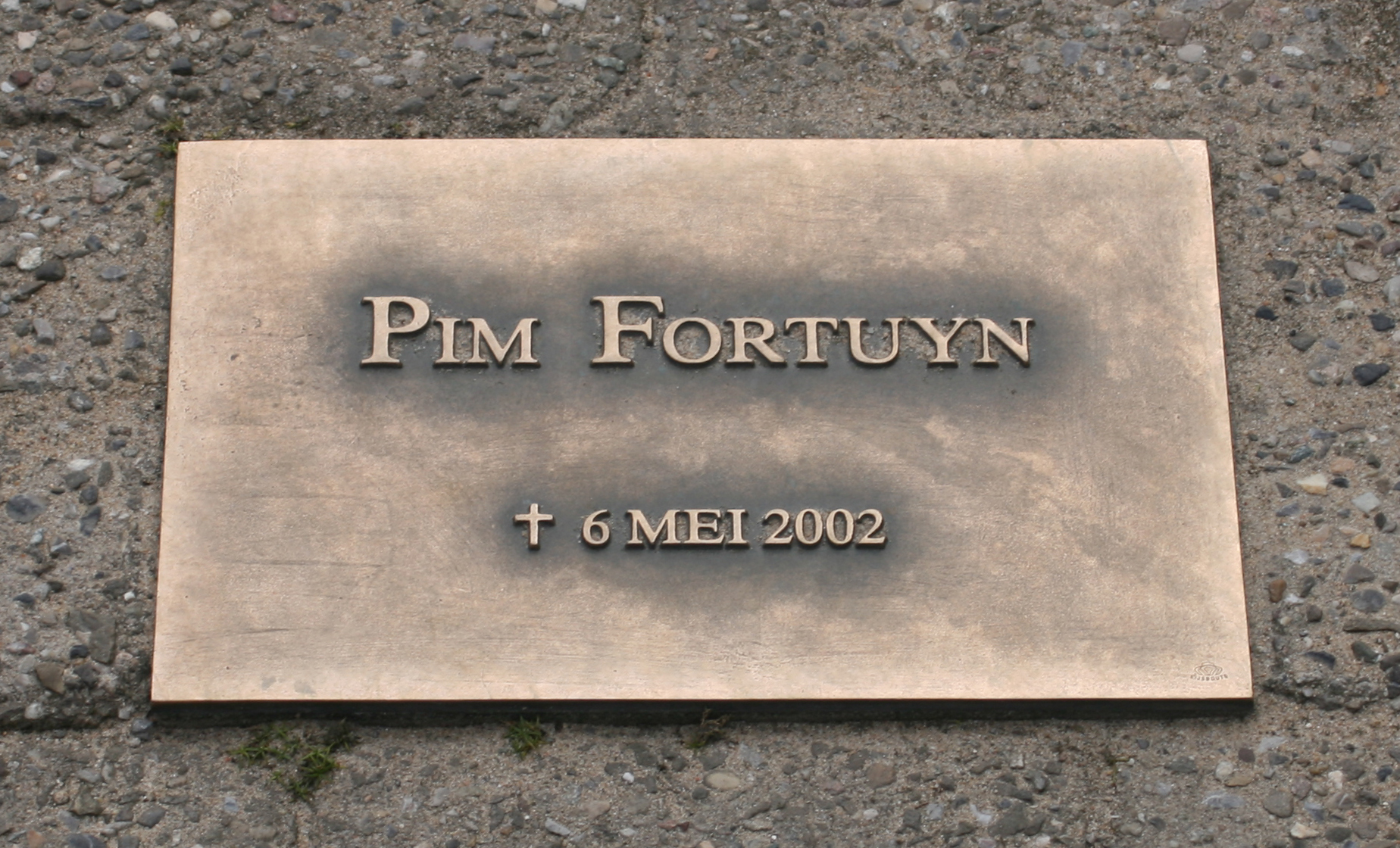
Plaque at the location of his murder

Right-wing politicians gained greater public influence after Fortuyn's death, such as former Minister for Integration & Immigration Rita Verdonk, the prominent critic of Islam, Member of the House of Representatives Geert Wilders who in 2006 formed the Party for Freedom (which became the largest party in the House of Representatives in 2023). These politicians often focus on the debate over cultural assimilation and integration.

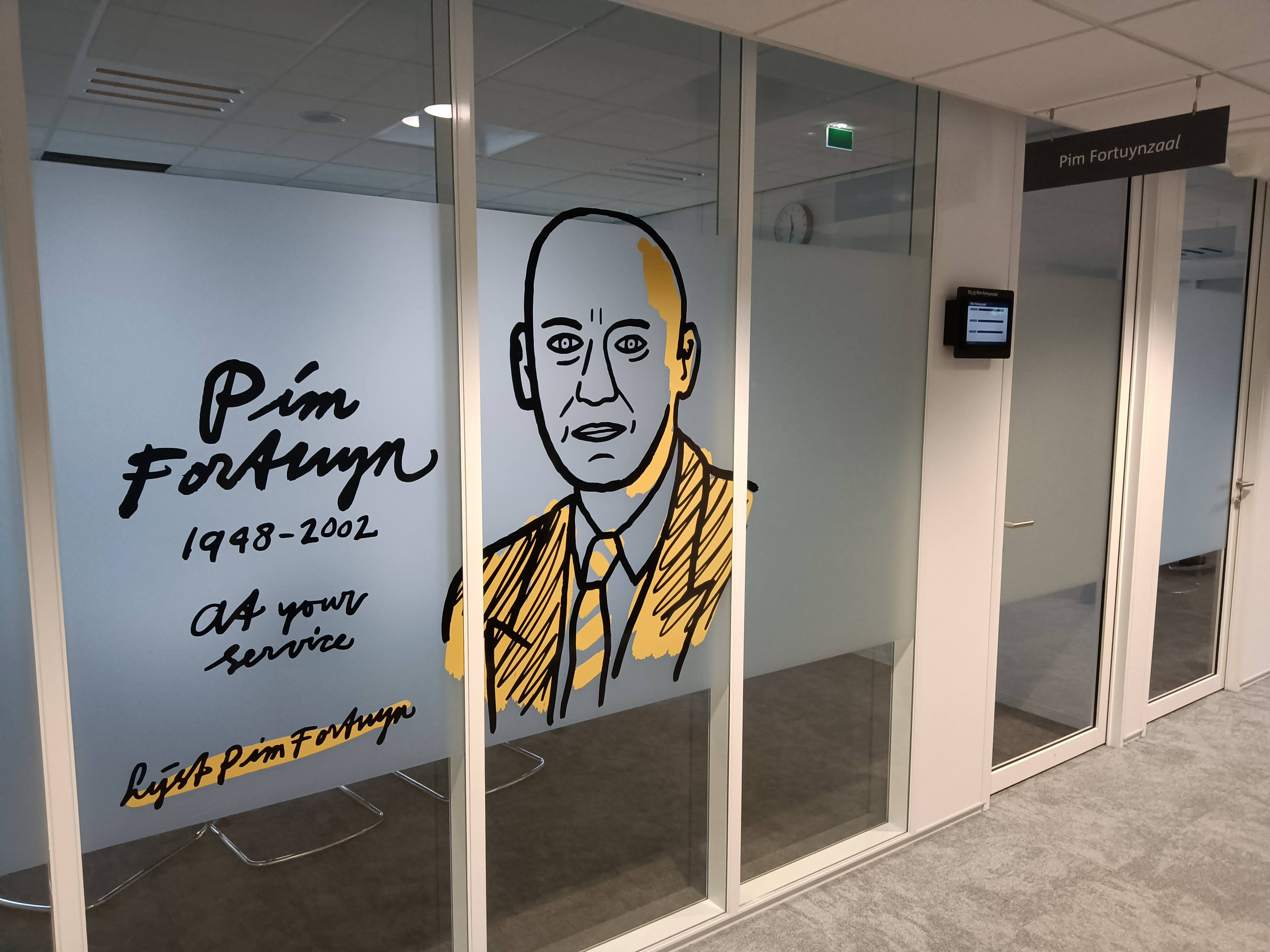
Meeting room named after Fortuyn in the House of Representatives

Between 2003 and 2004, Fortuyn's family donated the condolence letters, cards, objects and register books that were placed at various locations associated with Fortuyn such as his home, Rotterdam city hall, the Homomonument in Amsterdam, Media Park in Hilversum and the House of Representatives to the Meertens Institute. They are currently housed in the institute's archive and can be consulted for research.

Supporters of Fortuyn went on to set up the annual Pim Fortuyn Prize which is awarded to opinion makers, politicians or commentators who best convey the ideas of Pim Fortuyn. Winners have included Ebru Umar, John van den Heuvel and Belgian Prime Minister Bart De Wever.

In 2012, exactly ten years after Fortuyn's murder, a section of the Korte Hoogstraat (city centre) of Rotterdam was renamed Pim Fortuynplaats. Around a thousand people attended the ceremony.

In 2023, a meeting room was named after Fortuyn in the temporary House of Representatives which contains a memorial window.

To mark the 22nd anniversary of his death in May 2024, a crowdfunding campaign was started with the approval of Fortuyn's family with the aim of having a number of Fortuyn's books narrated with an AI -generated voice of Fortuyn.

== Selected publications ==
- Het zakenkabinet Fortuyn (A.W. Bruna, 1994)
- Beklemmend Nederland (A.W. Bruna, 1995), (ISBN 90-229-8234-3)
- Uw baan staat op de tocht!: Het einde van de overlegeconomie (A.W. Bruna, 1995) (ISBN 978-90-229-8264-8
- Mijn collega komt zo bij u (A.W. Bruna, 1996), (ISBN 9789022983119)
- Tegen de islamisering van onze cultuur: Nederlandse identiteit als fundament (A.W. Bruna, 1997), (ISBN 90-229-8338-2)
- Zielloos Europa (Bruna, 1997), (ISBN 90-229-8352-8)
- 50 jaar Israel, hoe lang nog?: Tegen het tolereren van fundamentalisme (Bruna, 1998), (ISBN 90-229-8407-9)
- De derde revolutie (bruna, 1999)
- De verweesde samenleving (Karakter Uitgevers, 2002) (ISBN 90-6112-931-1)
- De puinhopen van acht jaar Paars (Karakter Uitgevers, 2002), (ISBN 90-6112-911-7)

== In popular culture ==
- The song "Feint" by Epica was made right after and about Pim Fortuyn's death.
- Fortuyn's death is referenced in the novel De zesde mei (The Sixth of May) by Tomas Ross.
- 06/05, a 2004 film directed by Theo Van Gogh based upon the murder of Pim Fortuyn albeit with fictitious elements.
- Het jaar van Fortuyn (The Year of Fortuyn), a 2022 five-part biographical drama broadcast on AVROTROS which depicts Fortuyn's political rise ahead of the 2002 election to his assassination. Fortuyn is portrayed by Jeroen Spitzenberger in the series.

== Notes ==
Party political offices
New creation	Leader of Livable Netherlands; 2001–2002	Succeeded by Fred Teeven
New creation	Leader of the Pim Fortuyn List; 2002	Succeeded by Mat Herben
New creation	Chairman of the Pim Fortuyn List; 2002	Succeeded by Peter Langendam
