= Godfried Bomans =

Dutch author (1913–1971)

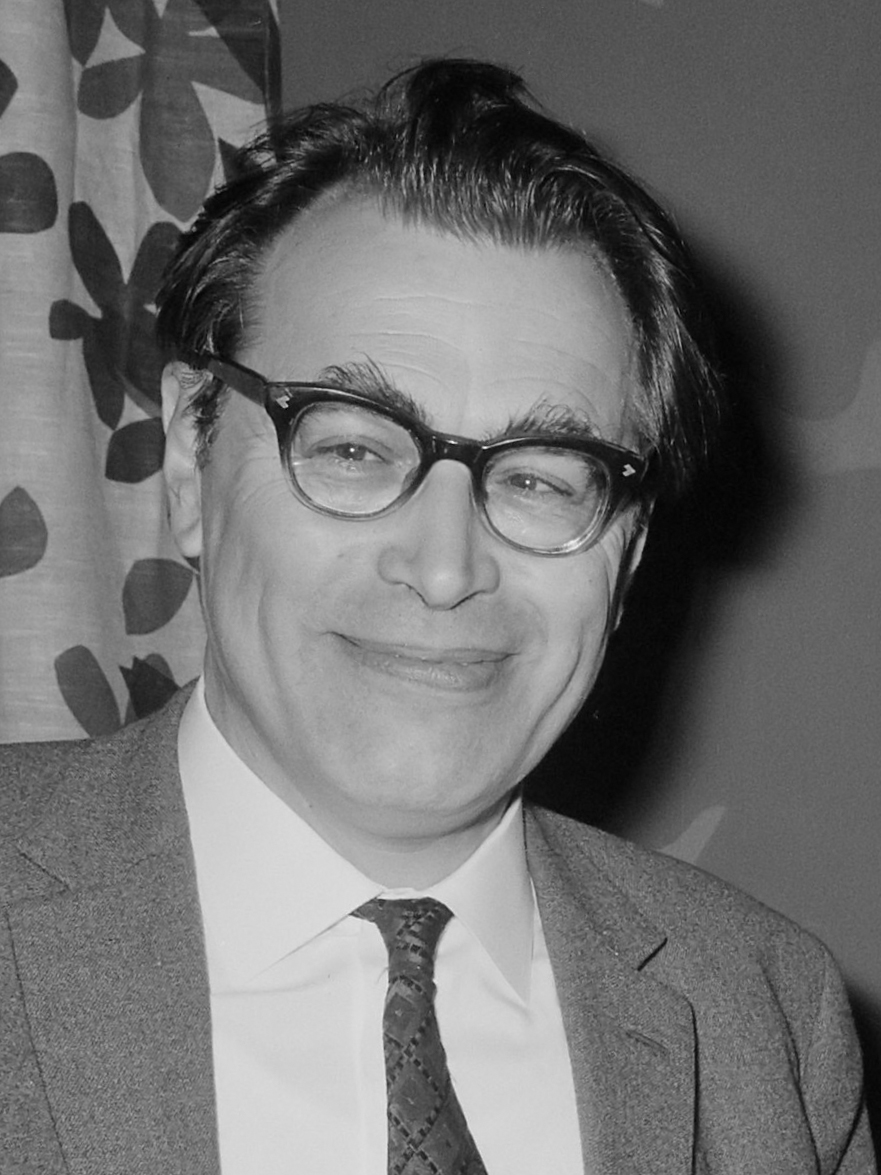
- Bomans in 1965
- Born: Godfried Jan Arnold Bomans; 2 March 1913; The Hague, Netherlands
- Died: 22 December 1971 (aged 58); Bloemendaal, Netherlands
- Education: University of Amsterdam
- Occupation: Writer
- Writing career
- Language: Dutch
- Years active: 1936–1971

Godfried Jan Arnold Bomans (2 March 1913 – 22 December 1971) was a Dutch author and television personality. Much of his work remains untranslated into English.

== Life and career ==
Godfried Bomans was born in The Hague and grew up in and around Haarlem, where his father had a law office.

Already as a pupil in high school Bomans showed literary interest; he became editor of school newspapers and published short stories, even in literary and student magazines.

He originally studied law at the University of Amsterdam (1933–1938; LL.B.) and then until 1942 psychology and philosophy at the University of Nijmegen, but spent his entire life writing.

In 1943 he quit his studies and moved back to Haarlem. There he helped save a number of Jews, for which he received the distinction Righteous Among the Nations. He is best known for his books of modern-day fairy tales and his short, humorous pieces full of wit, parody and mild irony. In 1950 he began an artist's club in Haarlem called Teisterbant, that became better known for its literary influences rather than other arts. He was friends with leading Haarlem artists and writers, and was "best man" for local artist Anton Heyboer in 1953. He was a widely read author in the 1950s and 1960s, but he is not mentioned in most histories of Dutch literature and did not receive a single literary prize. Nevertheless, a seven-volume edition of his collected Works was published between 1996 and 1999. His phantasy book Erik, or the Little Insect Book (1940), widely read during the German occupation of the Netherlands (1940–1945), was made into a film in 2004.

After the war, he became known in the Netherlands for his series on the hilarious adventures of Pa Pinkelman and Tante Pollewop, published in De Avonturen van Pa Pinkelman (1946) and Avonturen van Tante Pollewop (1948), both illustrated by Carol Voges. These were syndicalized in the then Catholic newspaper de Volkskrant. For that paper he also wrote a unique two-column column on the front page on Saturdays, until a row with the then editor Jan van der Pluym in 1967, who wanted to break loose from the paper's Catholic background, put an end to that.

Aside from his fairy tales and humorous books, Bomans also produced numerous collections of essays and criticism. During the 1950s he wrote a very entertaining travel book about Rome – Wandelingen door Rome (Walks Through Rome).

His radio and television appearances were mainly in the role of an eccentric wit on discussion panels and in game shows. He was one of the first writers in the Netherlands to appear regularly on television. He became a media personality, a new phenomenon in the late 1950s and early 1960s. This contributed to his popularity, but hardly to any respect among the 'critical' literary elite who frowned upon these less serious appearances.

A memorable event in the history of Dutch television was a live comment by Bomans. In October 1963 he was invited to the Edison Award-ceremony of the Grand Gala du Disque Populaire. One of the performing artists was Marlene Dietrich. Bomans stood next to the diva that he admired and told a frolicking anecdote ending with the famous line (attributed by him in this anecdote to a mumbling "very old little man" sitting next to him in the cinema): "I wish my wife had just one leg like that...". He was also well-known and admired for his Sinterklaas-stories and impersonations.

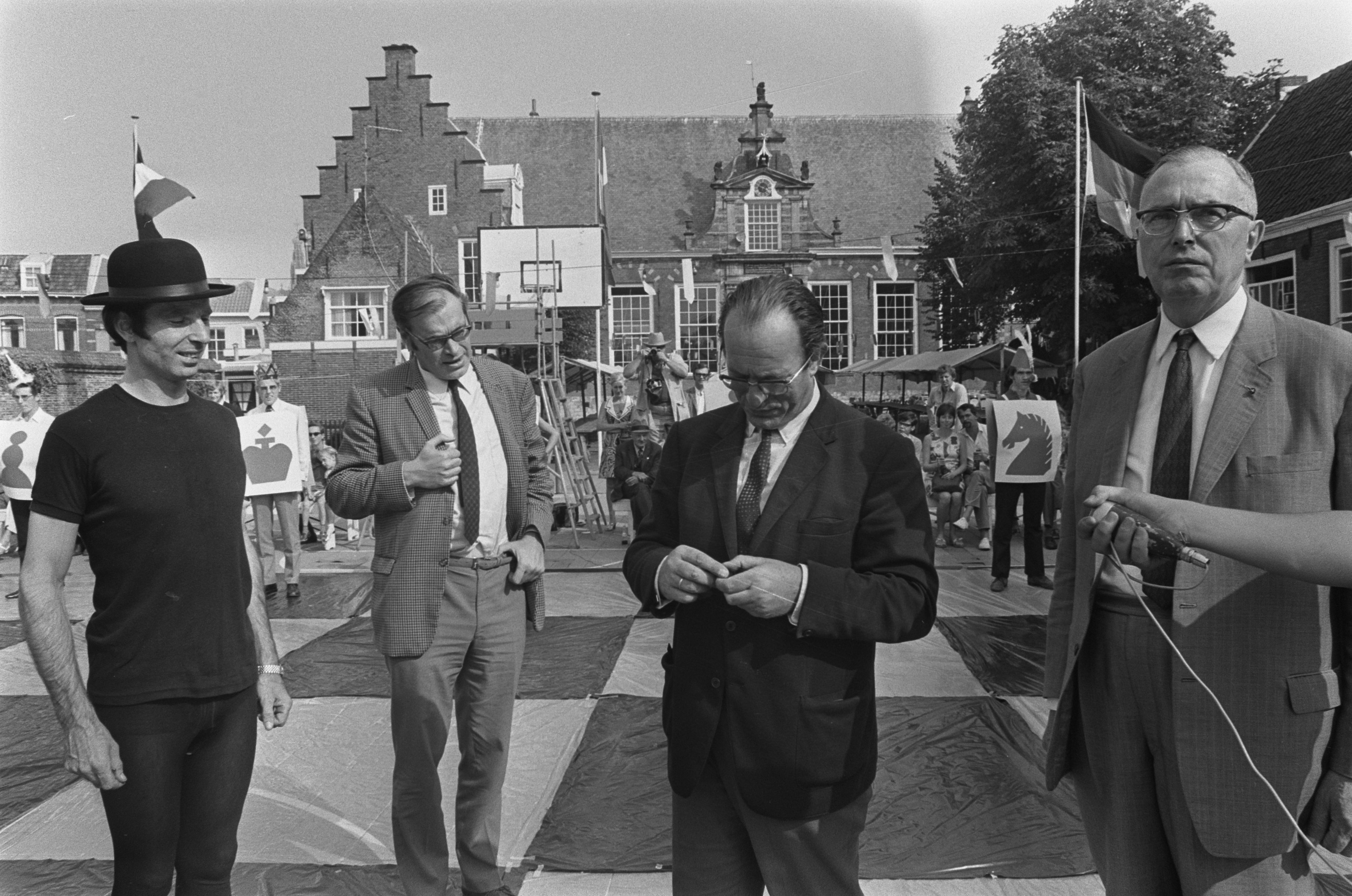
Godfried Bomans and Max Euwe play a game of chess with living pieces, 29 August 1970 on Doelenplein, Haarlem (currently location of Haarlem Public Library)

Being a staunch admirer of the works of Charles Dickens, he was a founder member (in 1956) of the Haarlem Branch of the Dickens Fellowship, of which he became a life president later on. In 1969 The Dickens Fellowship London made him a vice-president (an honorary member) to recognize his efforts to promote Dickens' works. An anthology of his collected writings on Dickens was published posthumously in February 1972.

Bomans died on 22 December 1971 at Bloemendaal, aged 58, from a heart attack and was buried on 24 December on the Sint-Adelbertskerkhof (Saint Adelbert Cemetery) in Bloemendaal.

== Legacy ==
In 1972 the Godfried Bomans Genootschap (Godfried Bomans Society) was founded.

In 2009, the IAU decided to baptize asteroid 23404 "Bomans". This asteroid was discovered on 15 September 1972 by the American astronomer of Dutch descent Tom Gehrels and its name was suggested by the Haarlem book collector Mrs. Loes Timmerman.

== Selected works ==
- Memoires of gedenkschriften van minister Pieter Bas, 1937
- Wonderlijke Nachten (Wonderful/Wondrous Nights)
- Erik of het klein insectenboek, 1940 (Erik, or the Little Insect Book), translated as Eric in the Land of the Insects (published Boston, 1994) . The book has inspired the film Erik of het klein insectenboek, (2004).
- Sprookjes, 1946 (Fairy Tales), translated as The Wily Wizard and the Wicked Witch and other weird stories (published London, 1969) and as The wily witch and all the other fairy tales and fables (Owing Mills, Maryland, Stemmer House Publishers, Inc., 1977).
- Kopstukken, 1947
- Pim, Frits en Ida (an eight-volume series of Children's Books, of which four were translated into English: Gnomes and princes, 1979; The uninhabited island, 1979; The runaway balloon, 1980; Captains, pirates and runaways, 1980)
- Dickens, waar zijn uw spoken?, 1972 (posthumously published anthology of articles on Dickens and his books)
