= Anne Frank Foundation =

Foundation to protect Anne Frank's house

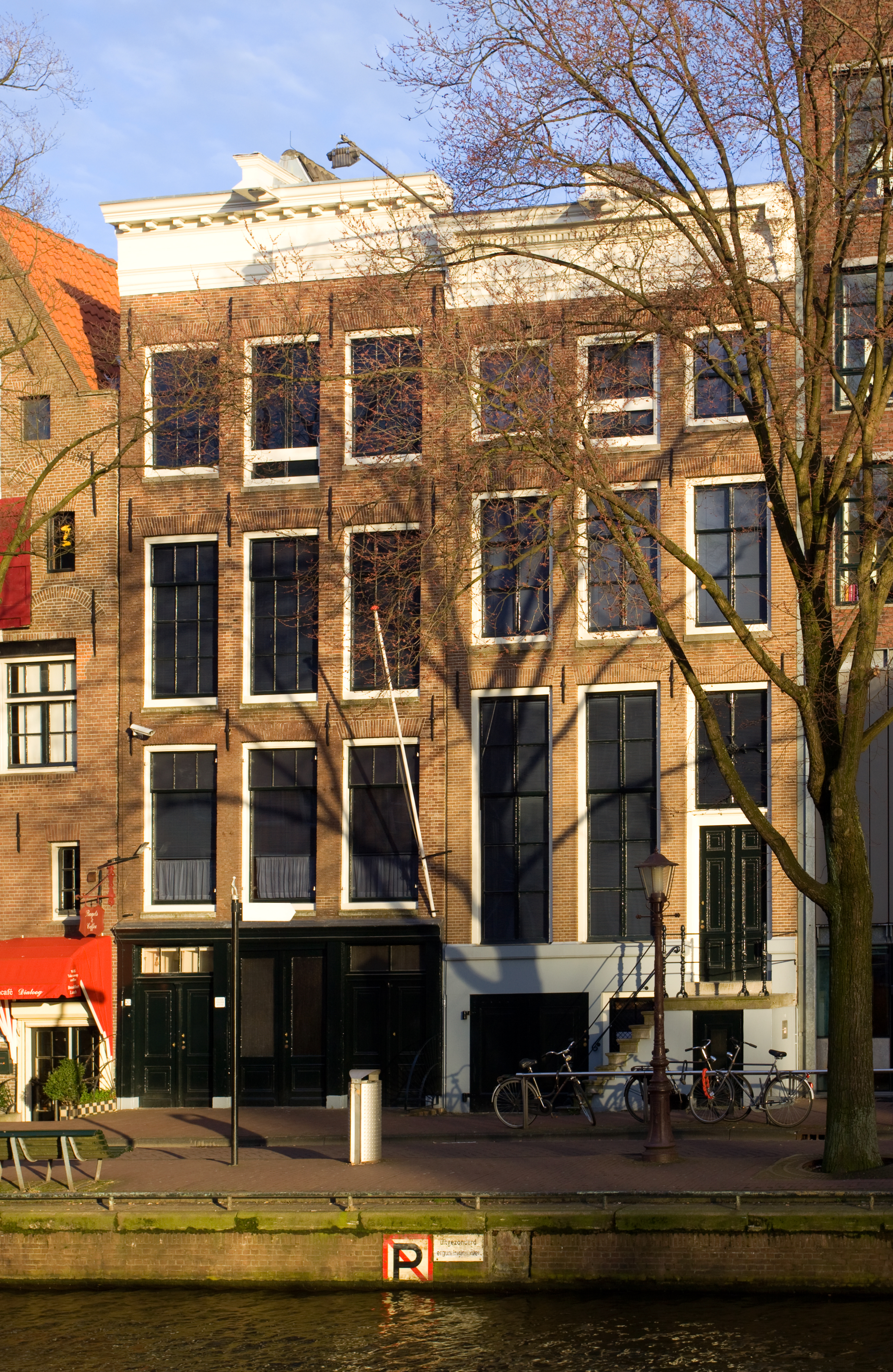
Anne Frank House (Amsterdam)

The Anne Frank Foundation (Dutch: Anne Frank Stichting) is a foundation in the Netherlands, originally established to maintain the Anne Frank House in Amsterdam. This foundation also advocates the fight against antisemitism and racism and publishes the Dutch annual Monitor Racisme en Extreem-rechts (English: Racism and Extreme Right Monitor), in which the activities of present-day racists and the extreme right are studied.

Outside the Netherlands, the Anne Frank Foundation organizes expositions and information on Anne Frank.

== History ==
When Otto Frank, the sole survivor, returned in June 1945, he tried to rebuild his companies and his life, but due to the war the property including the hiding place fell into disrepair. Otto lacked the ability to stop this until a group of prominent people of Amsterdam banded together to stop it. Thusly, the Anne Frank Stichting was founded on 3 May 1957 to prevent the tearing down of the house in Amsterdam in which Anne Frank was hidden since 1942 during the German occupation of the Netherlands in the Second World War. They intended to preserve the hiding place, open it up to the public, and promote her ideals.

In 1957, the Berghaus company which owned the building donated it to the organization. The rest of the attached building were also purchased fir at 350,000 guilders. The mayor of Amsterdam, Van Hall was involved as were the municipality and the University of Amsterdam to produce this funding. Thus the building was saved, restored, and on 3 May 1960 the Anne Frank house became a museum open to the public. Founding members included Otto Frank, Anne's father and resistance member Truus WIjsmuller-Meijer who remained on the board until 1975.

In an interview with Basler Magazin according to the Anne Frank website, Otto said about the mission of the organisation: "‘[...] the organisation’s work is not limited to managing the House. It was set up to increase awareness of the events of the dark years of the Second World War and the persecution of the Jews and to fight discrimination, prejudice, and oppression in the world today.’"

In 1992, the Foundation received the Geuzenpenning ("Beggar Medal') award and in 2022 the Cultuurfonds award of Prince Bernhard.

The director of the foundation was Hans Westra, who retired in 2011 and was followed by Ronald Leopold.

== Criticism ==
- Professor Arnold Heertje repeatedly criticized the Anne Frank Foundation in the media. In 2009, for instance, he reproached the foundation for "systematically distancing itself further and further from the historical facts of the story of the Jewish girl"—in particular by equating contemporary discrimination against non-Jews with the persecution of Jews by using Anne Frank's name so emphatically—and that the foundation's activities "no longer have anything to do with the persecution of Jews, but serve as fuel for commercial activities".
- Specific criticism has been directed at the Foundation's researcher, Willem Wagenaar, who makes frequent media appearances to discuss new insights concerning the far-right. This stems from indignation regarding his past as a left-wing extremist, as Wagenaar was sentenced to 6 months imprisonment for his role in the 1986 Hotel Cosmopolite attack, in which Centre Democrats secretary Wil Schuurman lost her leg.
