= Zendtijd voor Politieke Partijen =

Dutch public television segment

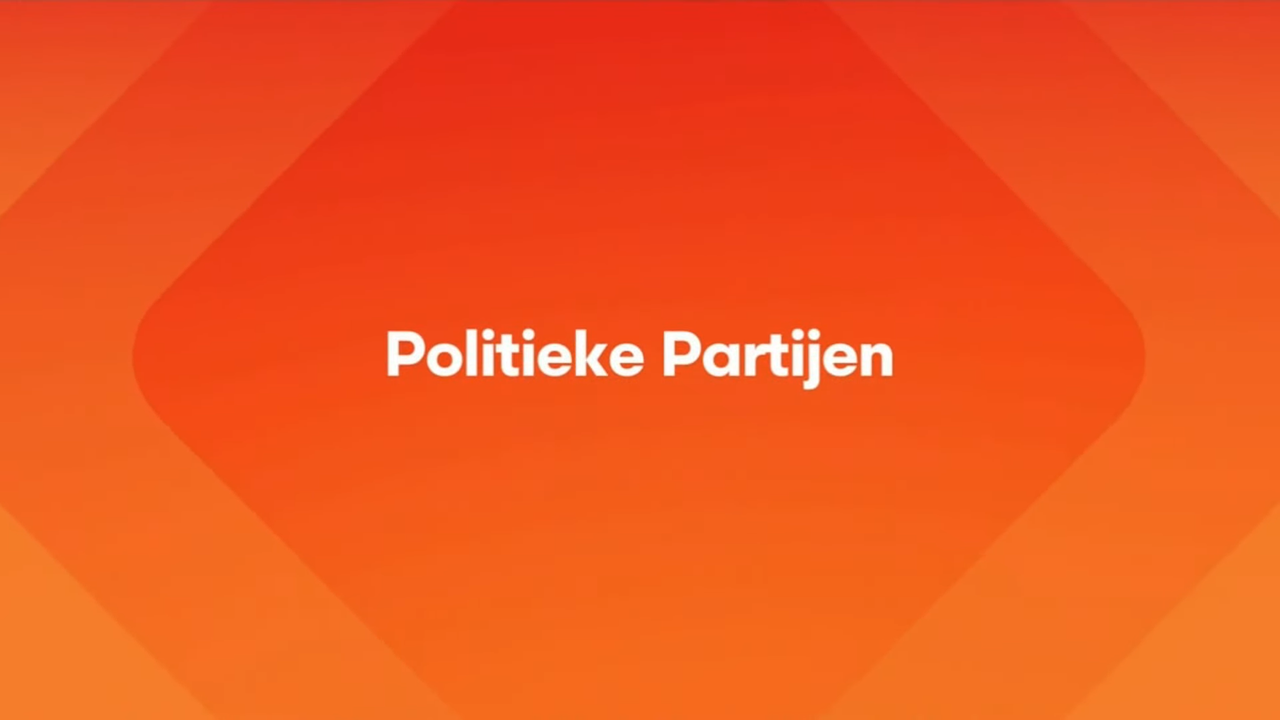
- Type: Public broadcaster
- Country: Netherlands
- Founded: 1951

Historical ident of Politieke Partijen

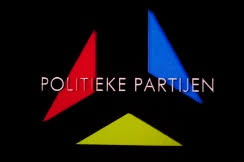
1980s ident of Politieke Partijen

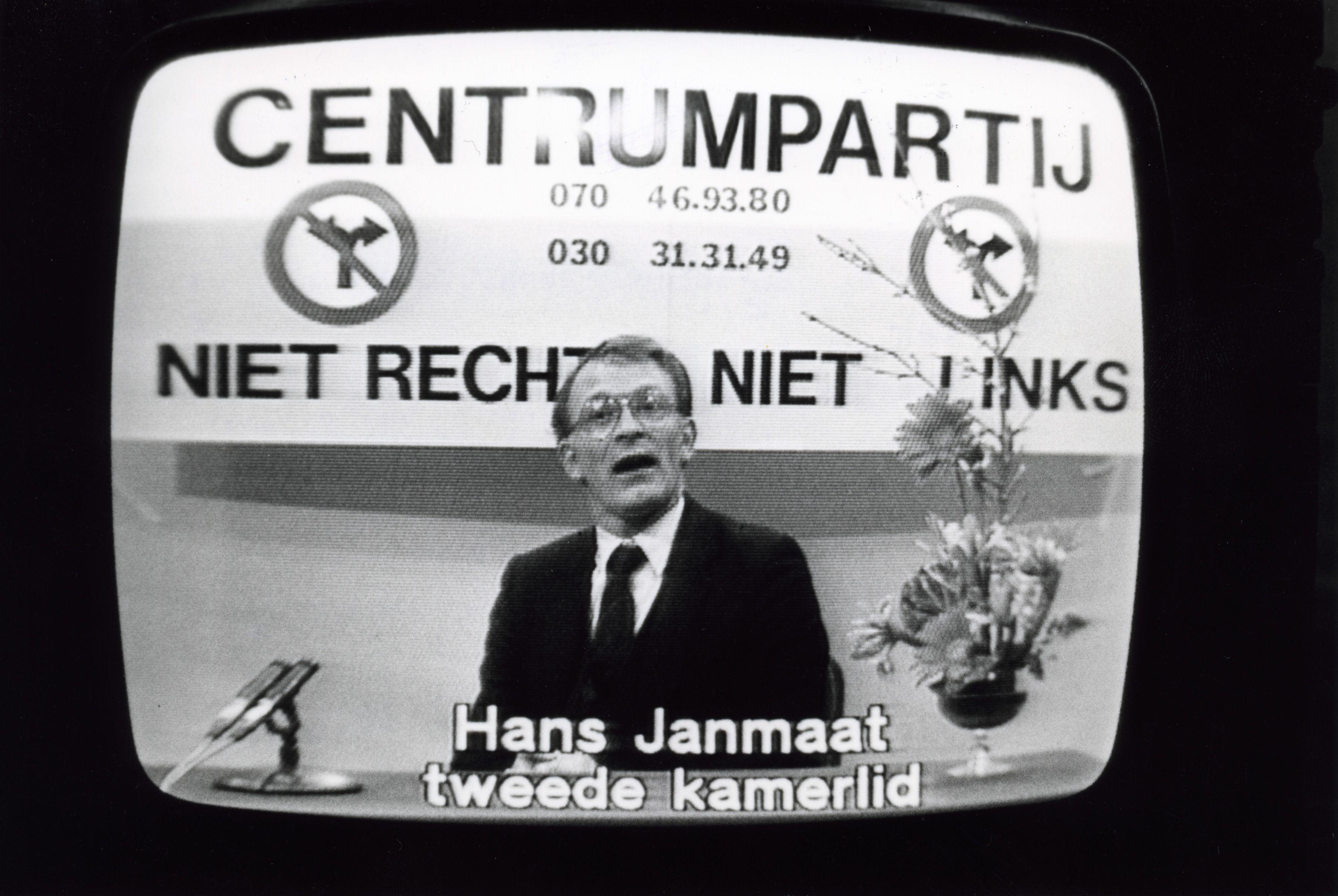
Hans Janmaat, leader of the Centre Party, during a television broadcast for political parties (February 1984).

Zendtijd voor Politieke Partijen (English: Airtime for Political Parties) is the section on Dutch public television in which all political parties that won seats during the last elections for the Dutch House of Representatives and Senate are allocated airtime by the Commisariat for the Media to broadcast their political ads. The amount of airtime is decided by the Ministry of Education, Culture and Science. During general elections and elections for the European Parliament airtime is allotted through a lottery organised by the NPO to all parties participating in 19 of the 20 electoral districts.

== History ==
In 1925, the Hilversum Wireless Broadcaster (Hilversumsche Draadlooze Omroep) first allowed political parties to broadcast an electoral speech over the radio. The Zendtijdbesluit of 1930 formally allocated airtime for the five pillarised radio broadcasters (the AVRO, KRO, NCRV, VARA and VPRO), leaving out the liberals who did not have an associated radio broadcaster. To mollify the liberals, in the 1929 and 1933 Dutch general elections airtime was granted to all participating parties. This policy was abolished for the 1937 general election because minister of the interior Jacob de Wilde did not consider it warranted given the international situation.

After World War II, political broadcasts resumed for the 1946 Dutch general election. Following the 1948 Czechoslovak coup d'état, the Communist Party of the Netherlands (CPN) was banned from being allocated airtime due to the CPN's rejection of the Dutch political system. This ban was only lifted in 1965.

From the 1959 Dutch general election on, the allocation of airtime would be expanded to television. In the years since, the Airtime for Political Parties has often been criticised as being boring and unnecessary, which has led to individual broadcasts being cut in length in 1989 from ten minutes to five or even two minutes.

Another attempt at excluding a political party would be made in the 1980s and 1990s towards the far-right Centre Party of Hans Janmaat and their successors the Centre Democrats, which ultimately led to an amendment to the law in 1999 allowing parties (or their representatives) which had been fined for discrimination to be excluded from receiving airtime. In practice, the two parties were never denied airtime for their political broadcasts.
