= Hans Janmaat =

Dutch politician (1934–2002)

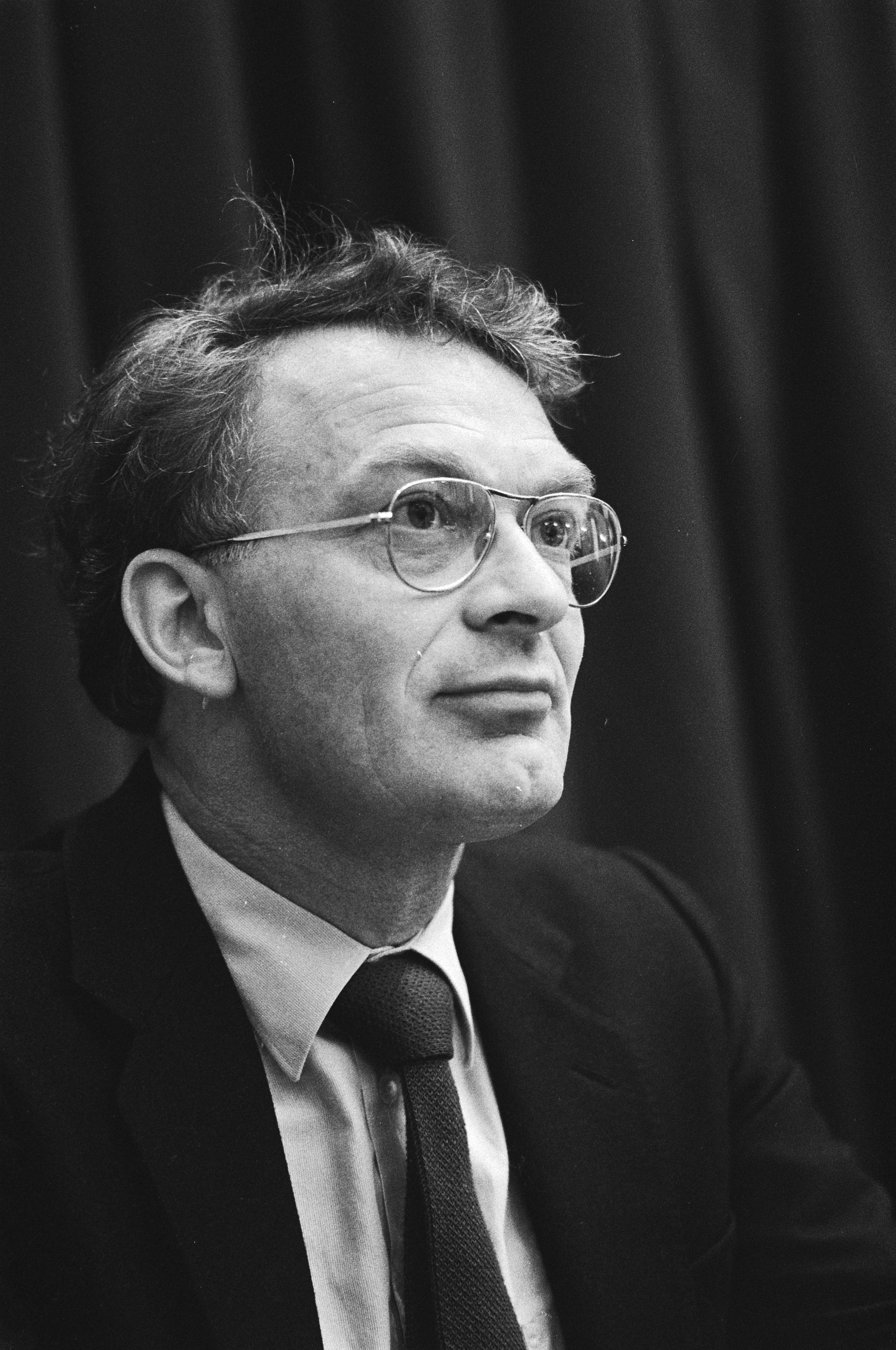
- Janmaat in 1983

Leader of the Centre Democrats
- In office 7 November 1984 – 18 April 2002
- Preceded by: Office established
- Succeeded by: Office discontinued

Chairman of the Centre Democrats
- In office 7 November 1984 – 18 April 2002
- Preceded by: Office established
- Succeeded by: Office discontinued

Parliamentary leader in the House of Representatives
- In office 14 September 1989 – 19 May 1998
- Preceded by: Office established
- Succeeded by: Office discontinued
- Parliamentary group: Centre Democrats
- In office 15 October 1984 – 3 June 1986
- Parliamentary group: Independent
- In office 16 September 1982 – 15 October 1984
- Preceded by: Office established
- Succeeded by: Office discontinued
- Parliamentary group: Centre Party

Leader of the Centre Party
- In office 16 September 1982 – 15 October 1984
- Preceded by: Henry Brookman
- Succeeded by: Nico Konst

Member of the House of Representatives
- In office 14 September 1989 – 19 May 1998
- In office 16 September 1982 – 3 June 1986
- Parliamentary group: Centre Democrats (1989–1998); Independent (1984–1986); Centre Party (1982–1984)

Personal details
- Born: Johannes Gerardus Hendrikus Janmaat; 3 November 1934 Nes aan de Amstel, Netherlands
- Died: 9 June 2002 (aged 67) The Hague, Netherlands
- Cause of death: Heart failure
- Party: Centre Democrats (1984–2002)
- Other political affiliations: Independent (1984); Centre Party (1981–1984); Democratic Socialists '70 (1979–1980); Catholic People's Party (1972–1979)
- Spouses: Josepha Hock (m. 1966; div. 1979) Wil Schuurman (m. 1996)
- Education: University of Amsterdam (Bachelor of Social Science, Master of Social Science)
- Occupation: Politician · businessman · teacher

Johannes Gerardus Hendrikus "Hans" Janmaat (YAHN-maht; 3 November 1934 – 9 June 2002) was a Dutch businessman and politician of the far-right Centre Party (CP) who later founded the Centre Democrats (CD).

Although he was widely known, he was never a major force in the Dutch political landscape, partly because of a cordon sanitaire imposed by Prime Minister Ruud Lubbers's third cabinet.

== Biography ==
=== Early life ===
Johannes Gerardus Hendrikus Janmaat was born on 3 November 1934 in Nes aan de Amstel in North Holland, as the oldest of nine children in a traditional Roman Catholic family. His father was a salesman and insurance broker. When Janmaat was 4 years old, the family moved to Gouda, where it would endure the war years in relative peace. After graduating in 1954, Janmaat started a study in aeronautical engineering, but had to drop out two years later after his father could no longer afford the tuition fees. Having to give up his studies to work was the first of many setbacks he would often refer to later in life.

In 1966 he married Belgian Evi Hock, having met her while working in Germany. In 1979, they divorced. In 1996, Janmaat married Wil Schuurman. No children were born in either marriage.

In the early 1960s, Janmaat ran a furniture factory with two of his brothers, but it burned down in 1966. He used the insurance payout to study politicology at the University of Amsterdam. Fellow-students found him ambitious, provocative and witty. In 1969, he participated in the occupation of the Maagdenhuis, the university's administrative center, as part of a student protest. He completed his studies in 1972.

=== Politics ===
After graduating, Janmaat held part-time positions as a teacher of civics. He also ran a one-man consultancy for small businesses.

In 1972, he joined the socially conservative Catholic People's Party (KVP). He also worked in several commissions for the Democratic Socialists '70 (DS'70) party. Despite his efforts, he was not considered suitable for a front line position because of his capriciousness and tendency to go against the grain.

In the 1970s, he became more interested in the emerging issue of immigration as large numbers of foreign workers came to the Netherlands. His increasingly radical stance against immigration lead to a break with the KVP as well as DS'70.

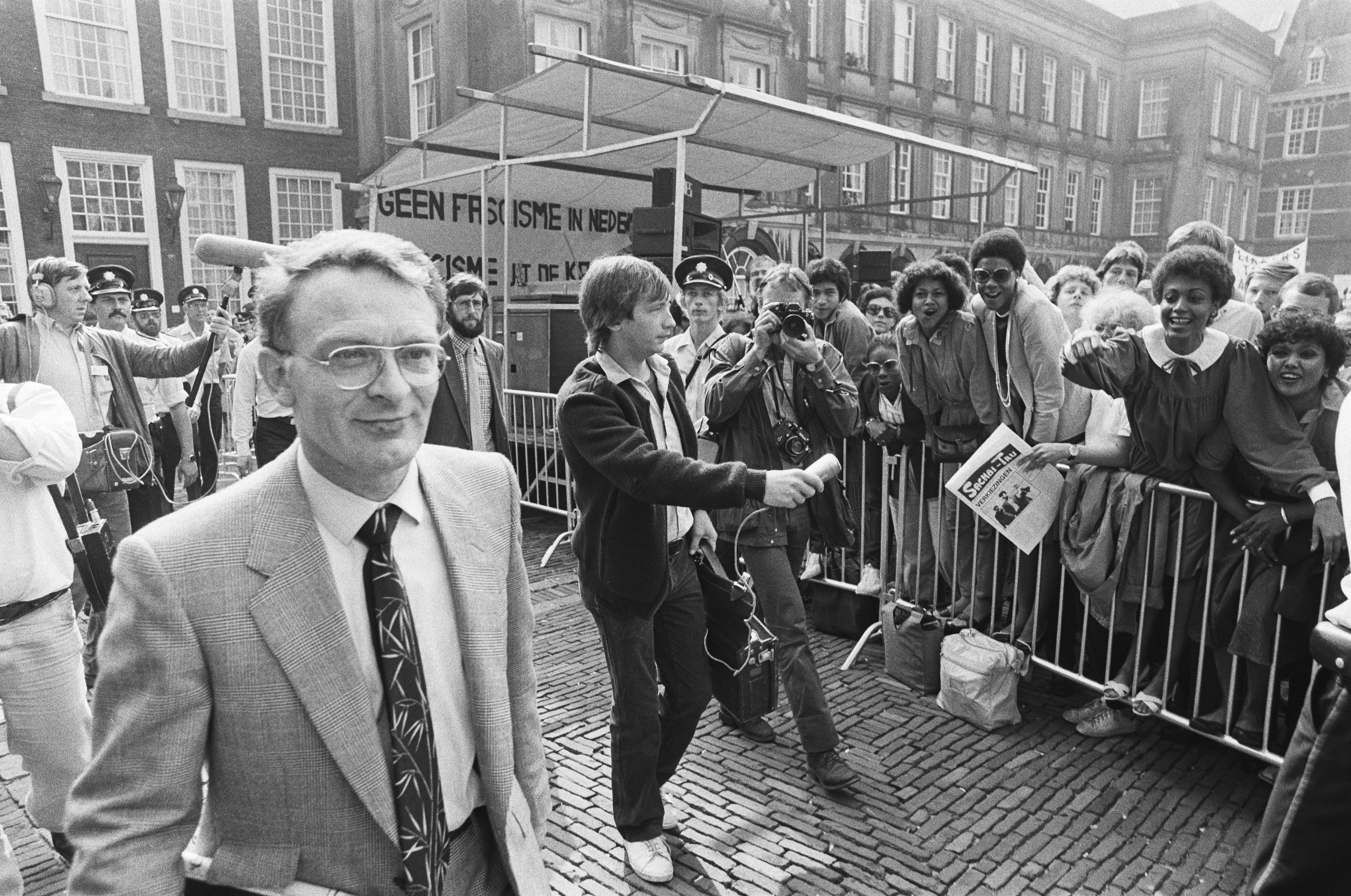
Hans Janmaat on the Binnenhof with protesters on 16 September 1982.

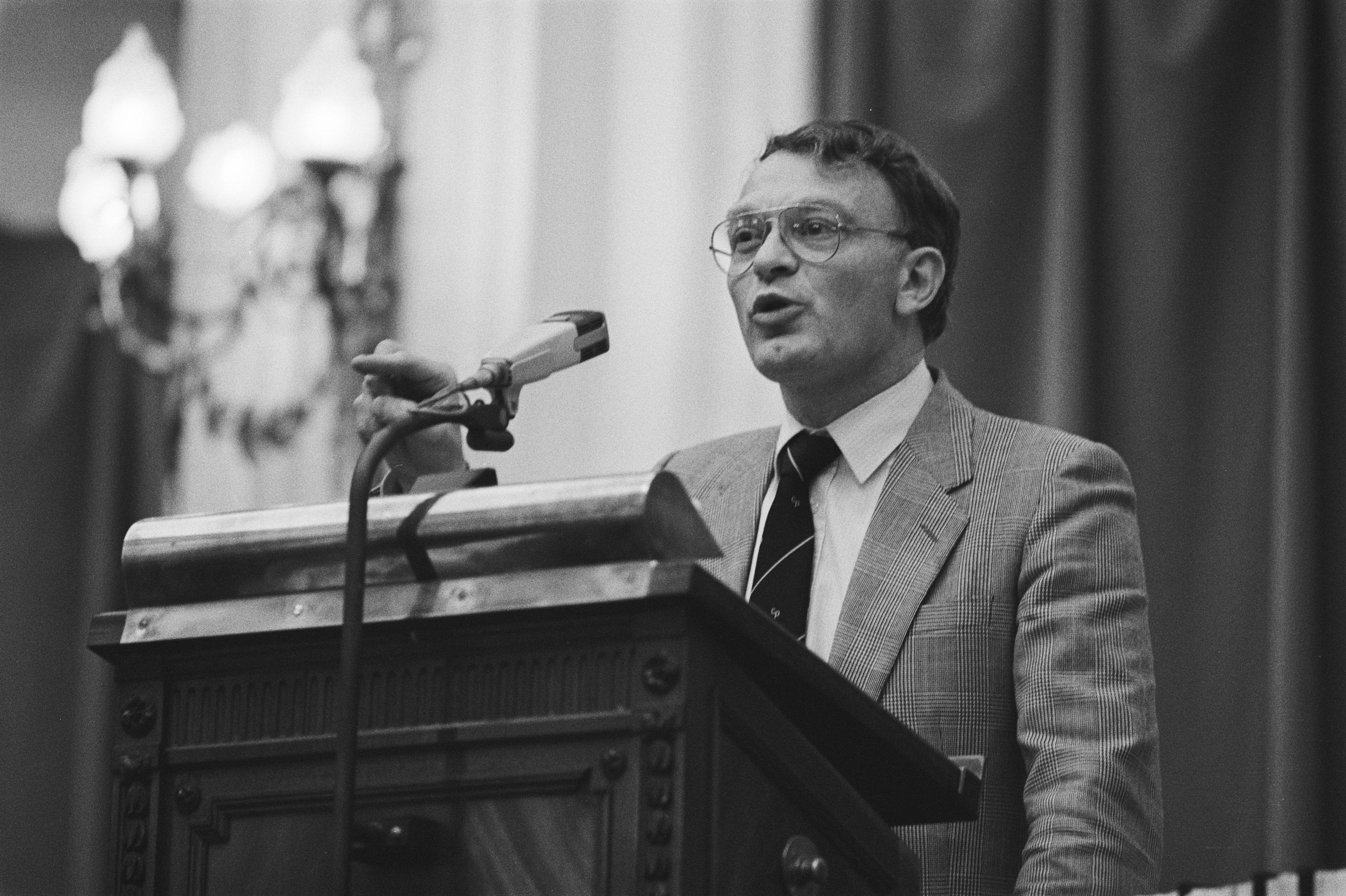
Hans Janmaat in the House of Representatives on 17 May 1984.

In 1980, he read an article in Vrij Nederland which drew his attention to the recently founded extreme-right Centre Party (CP). After several interviews, he joined the party as its seventh member. Starting as a publicity worker, he would rapidly rise to be the party's top and was its lijsttrekker (top candidate) for the 1982 elections. The party won a single seat in the House of Representatives, which went to Janmaat. Other political parties largely ignored and ostracized him.

=== Centre Democrats ===
After disagreements and a power struggle with other members of the Centrum Party, he was expelled from the CP in October 1984. However, he retained his seat in parliament, in accordance with Dutch law. Janmaat officially launched his own party, the Centre Democrats (CD) in November 1984. Politically, the party did not differ greatly from the CP, except that it was strongly centered around Janmaat, to prevent another power struggle.

Several attempts were made to reconcile the differences between CP and CD. One such meeting in a hotel in Kedichem was disrupted by left-wing activists, who set fire to the building. Janmaat narrowly escaped with his life, CD secretary (and later wife of Janmaat) Wil Schuurman lost a leg because of injuries sustained jumping out of a window to escape the fire.

In the 1986 election, Janmaat lost his seat in parliament, however he regained his single seat in 1989.

His biggest political success would be in the 1994 elections, when he gained three seats. Major political parties changed their response to Janmaat and his views: rather than actively ignoring him they also started openly addressing the issue of immigration. In the 1998 election the CD lost all three of its seats. Janmaat had become increasingly paranoid and said that computers used for voting had been tampered with.

In 1999, Janmaat was in the process of starting another party, the Conservative Democrats, however it did not get off the ground and did not participate in the 2002 election.

His failing health forced him to withdraw from politics, however the changing political climate did prompt him to challenge his conviction for discrimination at the European Court of Justice. Janmaat's death in 2002 halted the case.

=== Political views ===
Janmaat wanted to represent the ethnically Dutch workers and middle class. His views were based mostly on economic and materialistic arguments. Disappointing economic growth, unemployment and government cutbacks could not be addressed while large numbers of immigrants were flowing into the country. Janmaat was against a multicultural society: he argued that immigrants should return to their country of birth because The Netherlands was full, and that The Netherlands should be a country for the ethnically Dutch. His best known slogans were "Holland is not a country of immigration," "full=full" and "we will abolish the multicultural society, as soon as we get the chance and power"; he was convicted for the last two statements. According to Jan van de Beek, Hans Janmaat often used economic arguments as a justification for his tirades against immigrants.

He was often accused, and convicted, of committing acts of hate speech, and received fines and a conditional felony prison sentence for incitement to hatred and discrimination against foreigners.

In addition to his anti-immigrant sentiment Janmaat espoused anti-semitic views, and did not hesitate to issue negative remarks on other politicians. He argued that Ernst Hirsch Ballin should not be allowed to hold a high office because of his Jewish heritage, and said he was not saddened by the sudden death of political opponent Ien Dales.

=== Legacy ===
Other parties erected a cordon sanitaire around Janmaat, ignoring him while he spoke in parliament. A taboo on discussing negative aspects of immigration existed in the Dutch political climate in the 1980s.

Meindert Fennema, Emeritus Professor of Political Theory of Ethnic Relations at the University of Amsterdam, argued in 2006 that Janmaat was convicted for statements that are now commonplace due to changes in the political climate (caused in part by the September 11 attacks, and the assassinations of Pim Fortuyn and Theo van Gogh).

As the first public spokesperson who tried to put the topic of immigration on the Dutch political agenda, Janmaat has been mentioned as a forerunner of Pim Fortuyn, Geert Wilders and Thierry Baudet and their parties Leefbaar Nederland (and later Lijst Pim Fortuyn), Partij voor de Vrijheid and Forum voor Democratie, which booked massive electoral successes in the following decades.

Party political offices
Preceded by Henry Brookman	Leader of the Centre Party; 1982–1984	Succeeded by Nico Konst
Preceded by Henry Brookman	Lijsttrekker of the Centre Party; 1982	Succeeded by Pim Lier
First	Parliamentary leader of the Centre Party in the House of Representatives; 1982–1984	Last
New political party	Chairman of the Centre Democrats; 1984–2002	Party disbanded
New political party	Leader of the Centre Democrats; 1984–2002	Party disbanded
New political party	Lijsttrekker of the Centre Democrats; 1986, 1989, 1994, 1998	Party disbanded
New political party	Parliamentary leader of the Centre Democrats in the House of Representatives; 1989–1998	Party disbanded
