= Duke Henry of Mecklenburg-Schwerin =

Prince consort of the Netherlands from 1901 to 1934

Henry of Mecklenburg-Schwerin
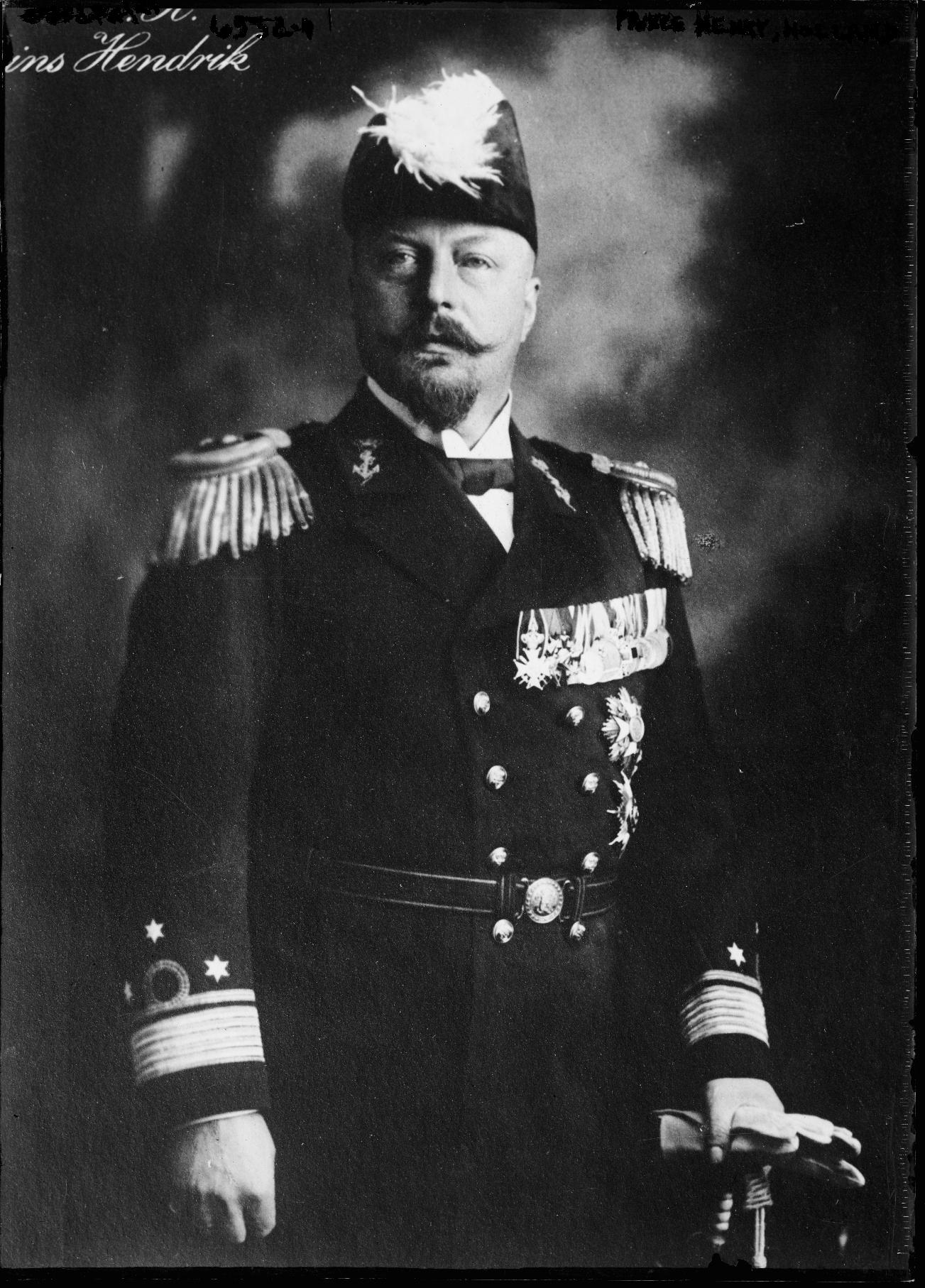
- Henry in 1915

Prince consort of the Netherlands
- Tenure: 7 February 1901 – 3 July 1934
- Born: 19 April 1876; Schwerin, Mecklenburg-Schwerin, German Empire
- Died: 3 July 1934 (aged 58); Kneuterdijk Palace, The Hague, Netherlands
- Burial: 11 July 1934; Nieuwe Kerk, Delft, Netherlands
- Spouse: Wilhelmina of the Netherlands (m. 1901)
- Issue: Juliana of the Netherlands; Pim Lier (illegitimate)
Names
- Hendrik Wladimir Albrecht Ernst
- House: Mecklenburg-Schwerin
- Father: Frederick Francis II, Grand Duke of Mecklenburg
- Mother: Princess Marie of Schwarzburg-Rudolstadt
- Occupation: Military officer

Duke Henry of Mecklenburg-Schwerin (German: Heinrich Wladimir Albrecht Ernst; Dutch: Hendrik Vladimir Albrecht Ernst; 19 April 1876 – 3 July 1934) was Prince of the Netherlands from 7 February 1901 until his death in 1934 as the husband of Queen Wilhelmina. He remains the longest-serving Dutch consort.

== Biography ==
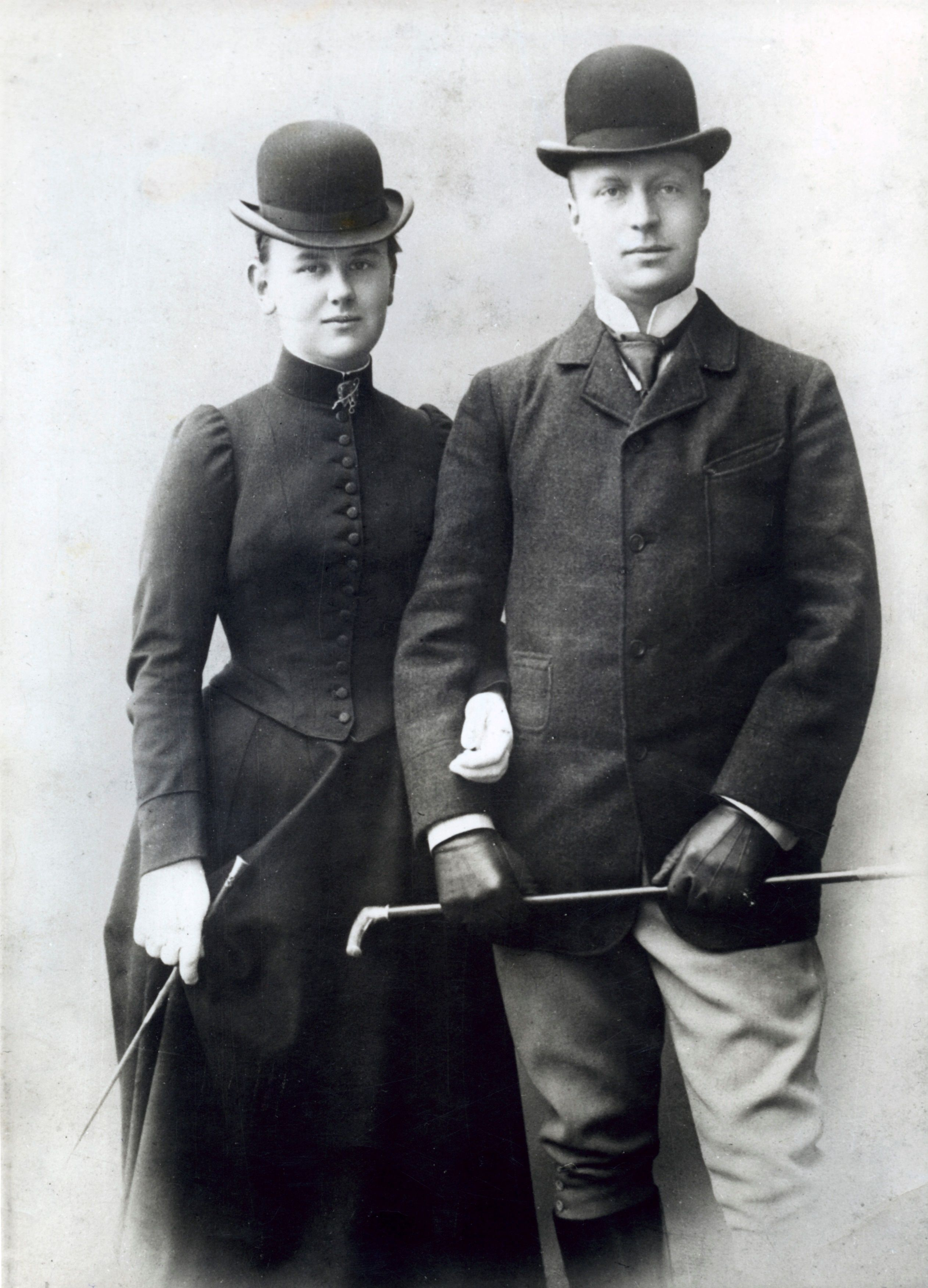
Queen Wilhelmina and Prince Hendrik in 1900

Henry of Mecklenburg-Schwerin was born on 19 April 1876 in Schwerin. He was the youngest son of Frederick Francis II, Grand Duke of Mecklenburg-Schwerin, and his third wife, Princess Marie of Schwarzburg-Rudolstadt.

On 6 February 1901, Henry was created a Prince of the Netherlands and the next day, 7 February, married Queen Wilhelmina in The Hague. Their only child together, Princess Juliana, was born in 1909.

Henry also fathered at least one illegitimate child, Pim Lier by his mistress Willemina Martina Wenneker (1887–1973). Born in 1918, Lier eventually rose to prominence in post-war Dutch politics as chairman of the extreme-right Centre Party. The birth of a son out of wedlock was likely symptomatic of the duke's increasingly strained relationship with his wife. That became all the more clear at the time of the opening ceremony of the Amsterdam Summer Olympics in 1928. Henry attended and even presided over the festivities, but Wilhelmina stayed away and stated that she was prevented from attending by her personal religious conviction that the type of event should not take place on a Sunday.

Henry became the 279th Knight Grand Cross of the Portuguese Order of the Tower and Sword, and in 1924, he was appointed as the 1,157th Knight of the Spanish Order of the Golden Fleece.

He died in The Hague, Netherlands, on 3 July 1934, aged 58.

== Scouting ==
Henry successfully merged the two Dutch Boy Scout organisations Nederlandse Padvinders Organisatie (NPO, Netherlands Pathfinder Organisation) and the Nederlandse Padvinders Bond (NPB, Netherlands Pathfinder Federation) on 11 December 1915 to form De Nederlandse Padvinders (NPV, The Netherlands Pathfinders). He became the Royal Commissioner of that organisation and he asked Jean Jacques Rambonnet to become chairman in 1920.

== Extramarital relationships ==
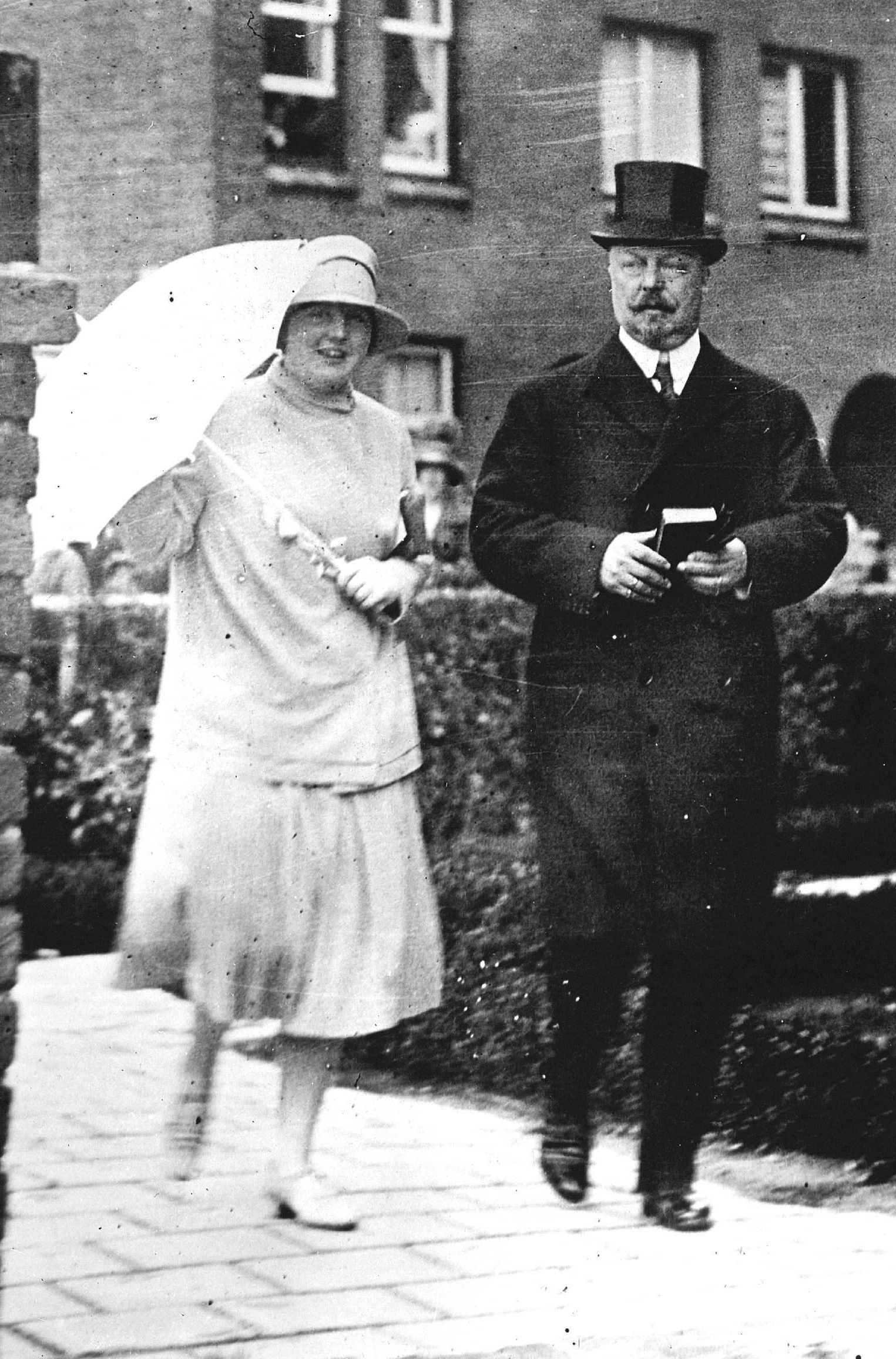
Prince Consort Hendrik and his daughter, Princess Juliana in 1928

Prince Henry was known to have had numerous extra-marital affairs. It is rumored that he fathered between three and ten illegitimate children; however, firm proof remains elusive, except for Albrecht Willem Lier, known as the above-noted Pim Lier (22 July 1918 – 9 April 2015). During her widowhood, Queen Wilhelmina paid monthly allowances to three known ex-mistresses: Julia Cervey in Geneva (ƒ200 per month), Wilhelmine Steiner in Zurich (ƒ500 per month), and Mien Lier-Wenneker (1887–1973), in The Hague (ƒ500 per month). Mien Abbo-Wenneker (later Lier-Wenneker), gave birth to a total of six children; the older two, sisters Christina Margaretha Abbo and Edith Abbo (later Sheep-Abbo) were ostensibly the daughters of Mien's first husband, Dhr. Abbo, but strongly rumored to have been fathered by Prince Henry. In 1919, Mien married Lieutenant Jan Derk Lier, a former aide-de-camp to Prince Henry. A grant of one hundred thousand guilders was arranged for Lt. Lier from the State by police chief François van 't Sant, whom Queen Wilhelmina engaged to verify the facts of her husband's extramarital relationships and children. This, plus a monthly allowance to the Lt from the state of one thousand guilders, was in return for his commitment to "the three children of HRH".

The male parent of the remaining three children was not verified as being either Prince Henry or Lt. Lier. Subsequent to their birth, no additional allowance was settled on the family; in fact, the monthly allowance of one thousand guilders to Lt. Jan Derk Lier was halved by van't Sant after a short period, although the allowance to his wife continued.

== Honours and awards ==
German decorations

- Mecklenburg:
  - Grand Cross of the Wendish Crown, with Crown in Ore and Collar
  - Grand Cross of the Griffon
  - Lifesaving Medal
  - Memorial Medal for Grand Duke Friedrich Franz III
  - Commemorative Medal for the Battle of Loigny-Poupry
- Bavaria: Knight of St. Hubert, 1912
- Baden: Knight of the House Order of Fidelity, 1905
- Brunswick: Grand Cross of the Order of Henry the Lion, 1907
- Oldenburg: Grand Cross of the Order of Duke Peter Friedrich Ludwig, with Collar and Golden Crown
- Saxe-Weimar-Eisenach:
  - Grand Cross of the White Falcon, 1892
  - Golden Jubilee Medal
- Saxony: Knight of the Rue Crown, 1897
- Lippe-Detmold: Cross of Honour of the House Order of Lippe, 1st Class
- Waldeck-Pyrmont: Merit Cross, 1st Class
- Württemberg: Grand Cross of the Württemberg Crown, 1901
- Prussia:
  - Knight of the Red Eagle, 1st Class, 27 September 1898; Grand Cross
  - Knight of the Black Eagle, 30 May 1901
  - Knight of Justice of the Johanniter Order
- Netherlands:
  - Grand Cross of the Netherlands Lion
  - Grand Cross of the Order of Orange-Nassau
  - Knight of the Gold Lion of Nassau
  - Grand Cross of the House Order of Orange
  - Grand Master of the Johanniter Order, 30 April 1909
  - Cross of Merit of the Dutch Red Cross
  - Wedding Medal of Queen Wilhelmina and Duke Henry of Mecklenburg-Schwerin, 1901
- Austria-Hungary: Grand Cross of the Royal Hungarian Order of St. Stephen, 1903

Foreign decorations

- Belgium: Grand Cordon of the Order of Leopold
- Bulgaria: Grand Cross of St. Alexander
- Czechoslovakia: Grand Cross of the White Lion, 5 June 1931
- Denmark: Knight of the Elephant, 12 December 1912
- Estonia: Order of the Estonian Red Cross, 1st Class
- Finland: Grand Cross of the White Rose, with Collar, 1931
- France: Grand Cross of the Legion of Honour
- Greece: Grand Cross of the Redeemer
- Japan: Grand Cordon of the Order of the Chrysanthemum, 9 June 1905
- Military Order of Malta: Bailiff Grand Cross of Honour and Devotion
- Norway: Grand Cross of St. Olav, with Collar, 25 July 1914
- Ottoman Empire: Order of Osmanieh, 1st Class
- Poland: Knight of the White Eagle
- Portugal:
  - Grand Cross of the Royal Military Order of Our Lord Jesus Christ
  - Grand Cross of the Tower and Sword
- Romania: Grand Cross of the Star of Romania
- Russia:
  - Knight of St. Andrew
  - Knight of St. Alexander Nevsky
  - Knight of the White Eagle
  - Knight of St. Anna, 1st Class
  - Knight of St. Stanislaus, 1st Class
- Siam:
  - Knight of the Order of the Royal House of Chakri
  - Grand Cross of the White Elephant
- Spain: Knight of the Golden Fleece, 9 March 1924
- Sweden: Knight of the Seraphim, 30 January 1901
- United Kingdom: Honorary Grand Cross of the Bath (civil), 26 February 1907

== Ancestry ==
Ancestors of Duke Henry of Mecklenburg-Schwerin

8. Frederick Louis, Hereditary Grand Duke of Mecklenburg-Schwerin
4. Paul Frederick, Grand Duke of Mecklenburg-Schwerin
9. Grand Duchess Elena Pavlovna of Russia
2. Frederick Francis II, Grand Duke of Mecklenburg-Schwerin
10. Frederick William III of Prussia
5. Princess Alexandrine of Prussia
11. Duchess Louise of Mecklenburg-Strelitz
1. Henry of Mecklenburg-Schwerin
12. Prince Charles Günther of Schwarzburg-Rudolstadt
6. Prince Adolph of Schwarzburg-Rudolstadt
13. Landgravine Louise Ulrike of Hesse-Homburg
3. Princess Marie of Schwarzburg-Rudolstadt
14. Otto Victor, Prince of Schönburg-Waldenburg
7. Princess Mathilde of Schönburg-Waldenburg
15. Princess Thekla of Schwarzburg-Rudolstadt

== See also ==
- PEC Zwolle, football club named in his honour
- Dutch State Mine (DSM) Hendrik, coal mine named in his honour

Duke Henry of Mecklenburg-Schwerin House of Mecklenburg-Schwerin Cadet branch of the House of Mecklenburg Born: 19 April 1876 Died: 3 July 1934
Dutch royalty
Vacant Title last held by Emma of Waldeck and Pyrmont as Queen consort	Prince consort of the Netherlands; 7 February 1901 – 3 July 1934	Vacant Title next held by Bernhard of Lippe-Biesterfeld
