= Wil Schuurman =

Dutch politician (born 1943)

Wilhelmina Berendina "Wil" Schuurman (born March 6, 1943, in Amsterdam) is a former Dutch politician who served from 1994 until 1998 in the House of Representatives on behalf of the Centre Democrats.

== Political career and activism ==
In her youth, Schuurman was active in the youth organisation of the Communist Party of the Netherlands. She joined the Dutch Labour Party in the 1970s, and later the Centre Party. At the time, she was working at a boutique in The Hague and later became manager at the De Bijenkorf department store.

She moved to the Centre Democrats as secretary to Hans Janmaat, whom she later married. Her leg was amputated after Dutch left-wing terrorists set fire to a hotel in Kedichem on 29 March 1986, when a meeting of the Centre Democrats took place at the hotel. The perpetrators were never caught. In 1990, she joined the municipal council of The Hague on behalf of the Centre Democrats.

In 1994 she was elected to the House of Representatives. She hardly ever took the floor during her time as member of the House of Representatives. Her run for the European Parliament failed.

In the Dutch Parliament building Schuurman received a room on the upper floor, where there was no elevator. She was dependent on security personnel to carry her in order to get to her offices and back to meetings. Schuurman complained that other parliament members laughed at her when she got a prothese.

In 1996, she married Hans Janmaat, leader of the parliamentary party. She lost her seat in the elections of 1998 when the Centre Democrats did not pass the electoral threshold.
