= Janmaat =

Janmaat is a surname. Notable people with the surname include:

- Daryl Janmaat (born 1989), Dutch footballer
- Hans Janmaat (1934–2002), Dutch politician and businessman
