= Loesje =

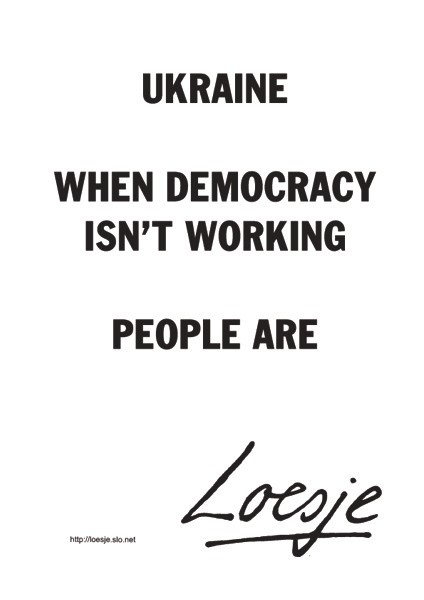
UKRAINE WHEN DEMOCRACY ISN'T WORKING PEOPLE ARE

Loesje (/ˈluːʃə/ LOO-shə, Dutch: [ˈluɕə]) is a pseudonym used by a group of Dutch poster writers, started in Arnhem (Netherlands) in 1983, and which became an international free speech organisation in 1989. Its charter is to spread creativity, positive criticism, ideas, philosophical ponderings and thoughts on current events by way of short slogans on posters. The posters are signed under the name Loesje, representing "a world wide collective of people who want to make the world a more positive creative place".

It is not clear how many active writers there are and also the number of people who decide to spread the posters that can be downloaded from the poster archive. The organisation cannot keep track of who spreads posters and where, partly because it is impossible to see how often a poster is downloaded (or printed at home) from the website, and partly because Loesje is not responsible for any misdeeds of individuals who paste posters on places where it is illegal.

Loesje participated as a political party in the 1986 Dutch general election, but failed to win a seat in the House of Representatives.

Between 2005 and 2013, Loesje's international headquarters were located in Berlin, but since then Loesje International has moved back to Arnhem.

== Controversy ==
While Loesje aims to write texts from a positive point of view, not all posters are always appreciated. In 2012, a local Loesje group in Amsterdam created a poster with the text "to honour Friso let's go binge-drinking on Queen's Day". Prince Friso was at that moment in coma in the hospital in London. The Dutch Loesje office distanced itself from this text, which was only published in Amsterdam.
