= 1986 Dutch general election =

← 1982	21 May 1986	1989 →
- All 150 seats in the House of Representatives; 76 seats needed for a majority
- Turnout: 85.76% (▲4.78pp)
Party	Leader	Vote %	Seats	+/–
CDA	Ruud Lubbers	34.59	54	+9
PvdA	Joop den Uyl	33.27	52	+5
VVD	Ed Nijpels	17.41	27	−9
D66	Hans van Mierlo	6.13	9	+3
SGP	Bas van der Vlies	1.74	3	0
PPR	Ria Beckers	1.26	2	0
PSP	Andrée van Es	1.20	1	−2
GPV	Gert Schutte	0.96	1	0
RPF	Meindert Leerling	0.91	1	−1
This lists parties that won seats. See the complete results below.
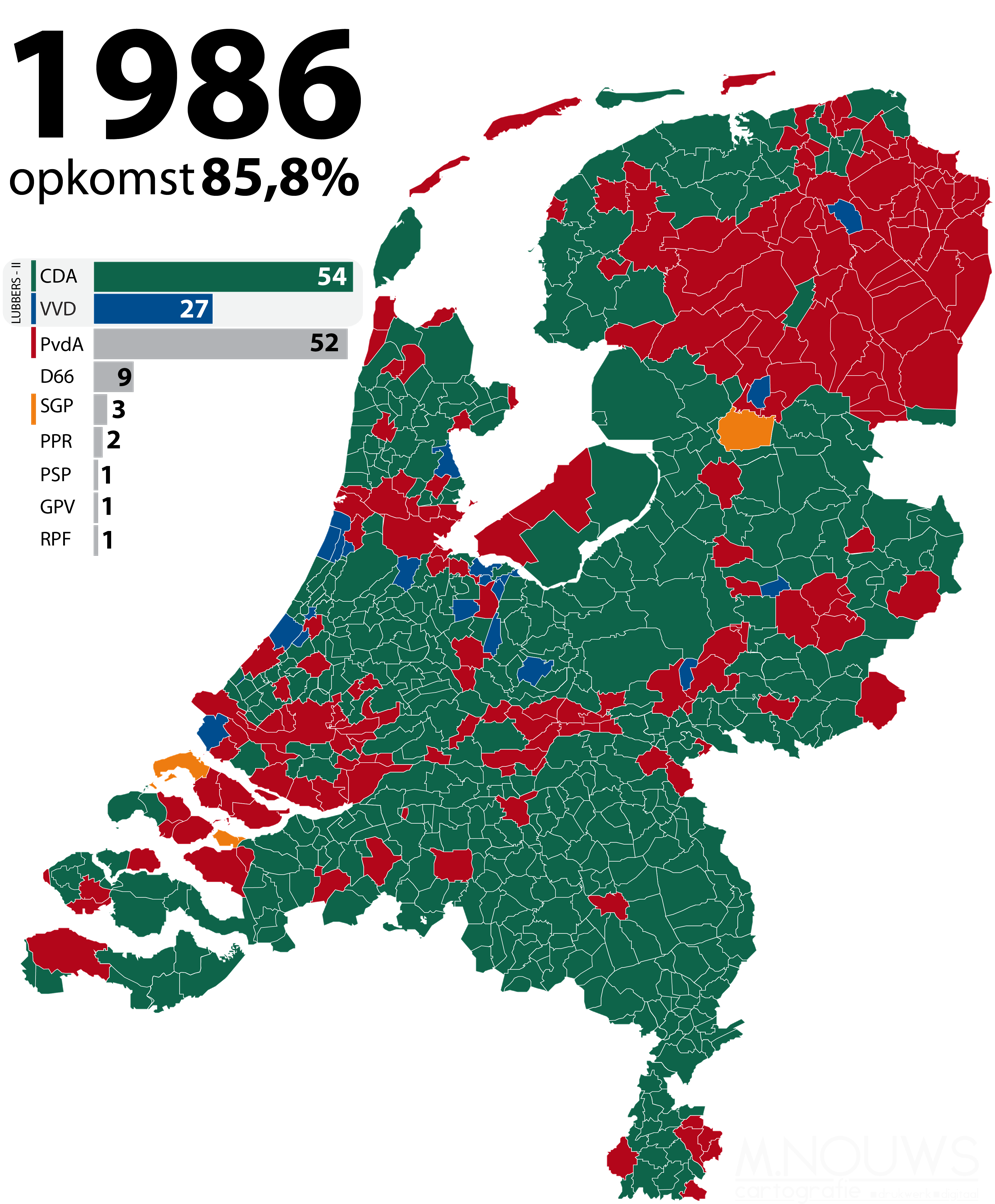
Most voted-for party by municipality
Cabinet before	Cabinet after
First Lubbers cabinet CDA–VVD	Second Lubbers cabinet CDA–VVD

General elections were held in the Netherlands on 21 May 1986. The Christian Democratic Appeal (CDA) emerged as the largest party, winning 54 of the 150 seats in the House of Representatives.

The incumbent CDA-VVD coalition maintained exactly the same number of seats as they had achieved at the last general election and continued working together in government with the CDA's Ruud Lubbers as Prime Minister.

== Electoral system ==
The Dutch parliament was elected using party-list proportional representation with a single nationwide constituency.

== Results ==
Party	Votes	%	Seats	+/–
Christian Democratic Appeal	3,172,918	34.59	54	+9
Labour Party	3,051,678	33.27	52	+5
People's Party for Freedom and Democracy	1,596,991	17.41	27	–9
Democrats 66	562,466	6.13	9	+3
Reformed Political Party	159,740	1.74	3	0
Political Party of Radicals	115,203	1.26	2	0
Pacifist Socialist Party	110,182	1.20	1	–2
Reformed Political League	88,381	0.96	1	0
Reformatory Political Federation	83,582	0.91	1	–1
Communist Party of the Netherlands	57,847	0.63	0	–3
Centre Party	36,741	0.40	0	–1
Socialist Party	32,144	0.35	0	0
Evangelical People's Party	21,998	0.24	0	–1
Federation of Greens	18,641	0.20	0	New
Party for the Middle Groups	15,297	0.17	0	New
Loesje	12,882	0.14	0	New
Centre Democrats	12,277	0.13	0	New
League of Communists in the Netherlands	4,618	0.05	0	New
Partij voor Ambtenaren & Trendvolgers	4,500	0.05	0	New
Anti Revolutionaries '85	3,664	0.04	0	New
Socialist Workers' Party	3,634	0.04	0	New
God with Us	2,375	0.03	0	0
General Interest Party	2,128	0.02	0	New
Luck for Everyone Party	1,184	0.01	0	New
Wissink List	560	0.01	0	New
Humanist Party	463	0.01	0	New
Brummer List	65	0.00	0	New
Total	9,172,159	100.00	150	0
Valid votes	9,172,159	99.70		
Invalid/blank votes	27,462	0.30		
Total votes	9,199,621	100.00		
Registered voters/turnout	10,727,701	85.76		
Source: Kiesraad

=== By province ===
Results by province
Province	CDA	PvdA	VVD	D66	SGP	PPR	PSP	GPV	RPF	Others
Drenthe	27.0	43.5	17.8	5.2	0.2	1.1	0.7	1.8	1.1	2.3
Flevoland	29.8	33.6	17.2	7.9	2.6	1.3	0.7	1.6	1.9	2.2
Friesland	34.8	39.5	13.0	5.2	0.6	1.1	0.8	1.6	1.4	1.5
Gelderland	37.5	31.5	16.4	5.4	3.0	1.4	1.1	0.7	1.3	1.7
Groningen	23.0	46.9	13.5	5.4	0.2	1.6	1.5	3.9	1.1	2.0
Limburg	46.0	34.0	11.3	4.4	0.0	1.0	0.8	0.1	0.1	2.4
North Brabant	44.2	29.6	15.4	5.5	0.4	1.1	1.1	0.2	0.3	1.7
North Holland	27.7	34.5	21.5	7.7	0.3	1.5	2.0	0.4	0.5	3.4
Overijssel	41.1	31.2	13.3	4.8	2.2	1.1	0.8	2.3	1.7	3.1
South Holland	29.4	33.7	19.7	7.0	3.1	1.1	1.1	0.8	1.0	3.9
Utrecht	33.8	26.6	21.6	7.0	2.5	1.7	1.6	1.6	1.2	1.6
Zeeland	32.9	29.6	17.8	5.5	7.9	1.0	0.7	1.4	1.5	2.9
