= Pim Lier =

Dutch lawyer, jurist and convict (1918–2015)

- Born: Albrecht Willem Lier; 22 July 1918; The Hague, Netherlands
- Died: 9 April 2015 (aged 96); Almelo, Netherlands
- Occupations: Lawyer, jurist
- Known for: Illegitimate son of Duke Henry of Mecklenburg-Schwerin
- Title: Master of Laws
- Political party: Centre Party
- Criminal charge: Murder
- Criminal penalty: 4 ½ years
- Criminal status: Released
- Spouse: Petra de Vries (m. 1948; died 1986)
- Parents: Duke Henry of Mecklenburg-Schwerin (father); Mien Abbo-Wenneker (mother)
- Relatives: Queen Juliana of the Netherlands (half-sister); Queen Beatrix of the Netherlands (half-niece)

Albrecht Willem "Pim" Lier (22 July 1918 – 9 April 2015) was a Dutch lawyer and jurist. He became well known in 1979 when he was revealed to be the illegitimate son of Prince Henry, the husband of Queen Wilhelmina, by his mistress, Willemina Martina Wenneker (1887–1973). This made him a paternal half-brother of Queen Juliana and the half-uncle of Queen Beatrix.

He became a member of the Centre Party in 1984 and served as chairman until 1986 when he defected from the Centre Party to join the Centre Democrats.

On 18 December 1986 he shot dead his wife due to her terminal illness. He served four and a half years in prison for murder.

Party political offices
Preceded by Nico Konst	Party chair of the Centre Party; 1985–1986	Succeeded by Danny Segers
