= 1989 Dutch general election =

← 1986	6 September 1989	1994 →
- All 150 seats in the House of Representatives; 76 seats needed for a majority
- Turnout: 80.3% (▼5.5 pp)
Party	Leader	Vote %	Seats	+/–
CDA	Ruud Lubbers	35.3%	54	0
PvdA	Wim Kok	31.9%	49	−3
VVD	Joris Voorhoeve	14.5%	22	−5
D66	Hans van Mierlo	7.9%	12	+3
GL	Ria Beckers	4.1%	6	+3
SGP	Bas van der Vlies	1.9%	3	0
GPV	Gert Schutte	1.2%	2	+1
RPF	Meindert Leerling	1.0%	1	0
CD	Hans Janmaat	0.9%	1	+1
This lists parties that won seats. See the complete results below.
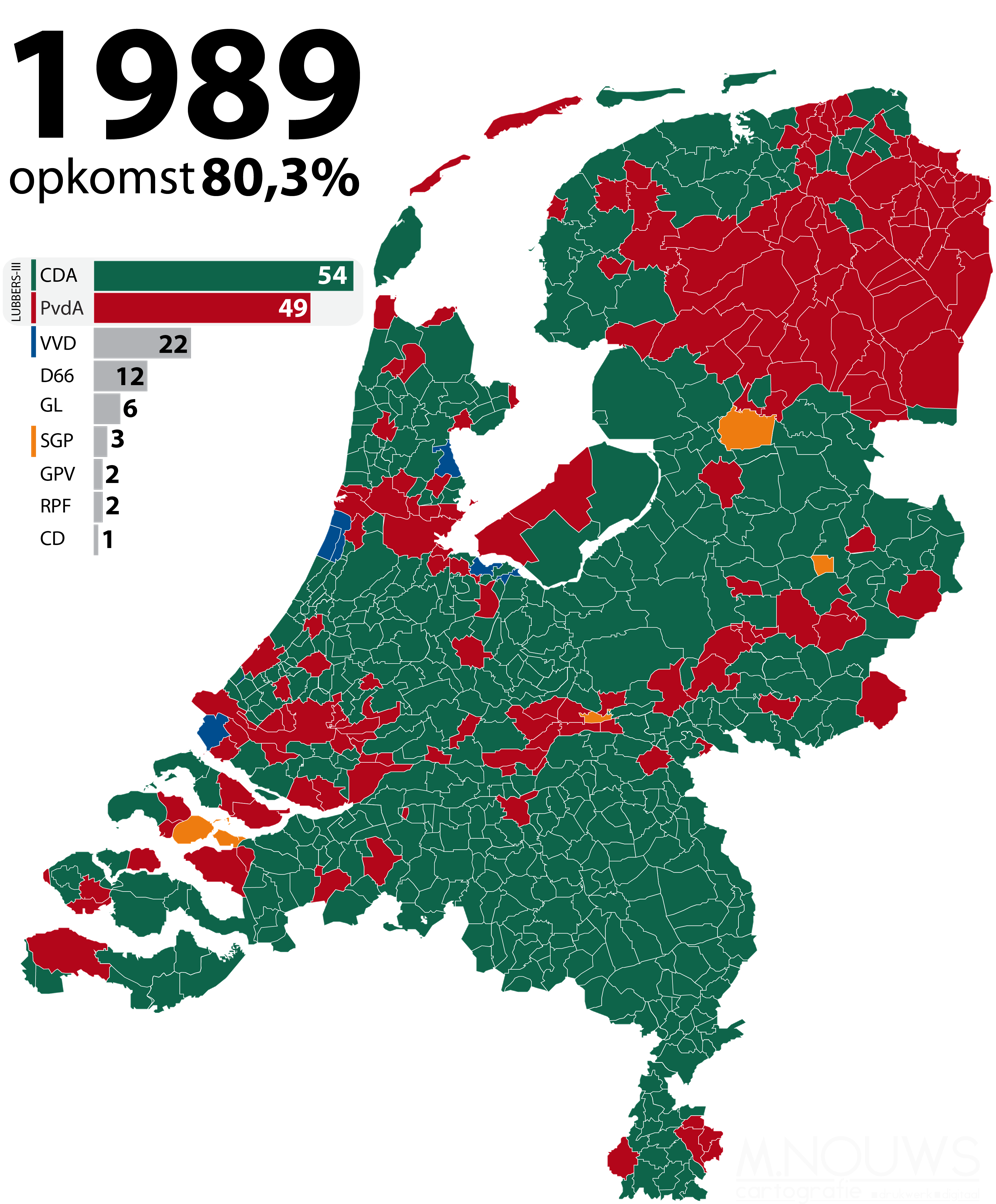
Most voted-for party by municipality
Cabinet before	Cabinet after
Second Lubbers cabinet CDA–VVD	Third Lubbers cabinet CDA–PvdA

General elections were held in the Netherlands on 6 September 1989. The Christian Democratic Appeal (CDA) remained the largest party, winning 54 of the 150 seats in the House of Representatives. This chamber served for 4 years and 7 months, the longest tenure of any modern Dutch parliament.

Following the elections, the CDA formed a coalition government with the Labour Party with the CDA's Ruud Lubbers continuing as Prime Minister.

== Results ==
Party	Votes	%	Seats	+/–
Christian Democratic Appeal	3,135,056	35.32	54	0
Labour Party	2,832,739	31.91	49	–3
People's Party for Freedom and Democracy	1,290,427	14.54	22	–5
Democrats 66	700,538	7.89	12	+3
GroenLinks	361,324	4.07	6	+3
Reformed Political Party	165,918	1.87	3	0
Reformed Political League	109,458	1.23	2	+1
Reformatory Political Federation	85,081	0.96	1	0
Centre Democrats	81,337	0.92	1	+1
Socialist Party	38,829	0.44	0	0
The Greens	30,698	0.35	0	New
Women's Party	12,018	0.14	0	New
Elderly Central	7,840	0.09	0	New
League of Communists in the Netherlands	7,361	0.08	0	0
Realistic Netherlands	6,032	0.07	0	New
Socialist Workers' Party	4,283	0.05	0	0
Anti-Unemployment Party	2,166	0.02	0	New
Political Party for the Elderly	2,149	0.02	0	New
Progressive Minorities Party	1,939	0.02	0	New
Party of Democratic Socialists	452	0.01	0	New
Socialist Minority Party	328	0.00	0	New
Humanist Party	318	0.00	0	0
Environmental Defence Party 2000+	138	0.00	0	New
Great Alliance Party	54	0.00	0	New
Constitutional Federation	31	0.00	0	New
Total	8,876,514	100.00	150	0
Valid votes	8,876,514	99.70		
Invalid/blank votes	26,389	0.30		
Total votes	8,902,903	100.00		
Registered voters/turnout	11,091,070	80.27		
Source: Kiesraad

=== By province ===
Results by province
Province	CDA	PvdA	VVD	D66	GL	SGP	GPV	RPF	CD	Others
Drenthe	27.5	43.6	15.2	6.5	2.8	0.3	2.0	1.0	0.3	1.4
Flevoland	28.6	31.4	17.6	9.2	4.0	2.6	2.1	2.0	1.4	1.1
Friesland	34.6	39.5	11.0	6.4	3.5	0.6	2.0	1.4	0.2	1.6
Gelderland	38.3	30.6	13.4	7.0	3.7	2.3	1.0	1.4	0.4	1.9
Groningen	23.4	45.5	11.5	7.0	5.4	0.2	4.2	1.1	0.3	0.6
Limburg	46.9	33.4	9.0	5.4	3.0	0.1	0.2	0.1	0.5	1.9
North Brabant	45.1	28.7	12.1	7.2	3.3	0.5	0.3	0.3	0.6	1.4
North Holland	28.1	32.3	18.9	9.9	6.2	0.4	0.6	0.6	1.4	1.9
Overijssel	42.0	30.6	10.6	6.1	2.9	2.3	2.6	1.7	0.3	0.9
South Holland	30.4	31.1	16.9	9.1	3.9	3.3	1.1	1.1	1.7	1.4
Utrecht	34.3	25.1	18.0	9.3	5.1	2.7	1.2	1.3	1.1	0.8
Zeeland	33.9	29.6	14.1	6.7	2.8	8.3	1.7	1.6	0.7	0.8

=== 5 largest municipalities ===
Results in the five largest municipalities
Municipality	CDA	PvdA	VVD	D66	GL	SGP	GPV	RPF	CD	Others
Amsterdam	15.2 (54 660)	42.6 (152 832)	13.6 (48 775)	11.0 (39 496)	10.8 (38 867)	0.2 (559)	0.4 (1 262)	0.3 (1 163)	3.1 (11 182)	2.8 (9 973)
Rotterdam	20.5 (61 454)	45.4 (135 966)	12.1 (36 330)	8.7 (25 921)	5.1 (15 299)	1.4 (4 163)	0.9 (2 589)	0.6 (1 866)	3.4 (10 279)	1.9 (5 782)
The Hague	24.5 (57 312)	34.1 (79 567)	19.0 (44 496)	10.3 (24 142)	4.9 (11 332)	1.0 (2 230)	0.8 (1 779)	0.5 (1 245)	3.1 (7 364)	1.8 (4 208)
Utrecht	23.2 (30 887)	37.5 (49 973)	11.8 (15 662)	10.7 (14 277)	10.6 (14 072)	0.6 (757)	0.8 (1 037)	0.4 (551)	2.6 (3 417)	2.0 (2 647)
Eindhoven	38.0 (41 212)	32.0 (34 699)	12.4 (13 380)	9.1 (9 817)	5.0 (5 433)	0.2 (203)	0.6 (604)	0.4 (395)	0.7 (737)	1.7 (1 900)
