= Cordon sanitaire (politics) =

Political term

In politics, cordon sanitaire (French: [kɔʁdɔ̃ sanitɛːʁ]; lit. 'sanitary cordon') or Brandmauer (lit. 'firewall') is the refusal of one or more political parties to cooperate with certain other political parties. Often this is because the targeted party has strategies or an ideology perceived as unacceptable or extremist. The term cordon sanitaire has been applied to refusals to cooperate with parties which are considered populist, extremist left or extremist right. The cordon sanitaire can be seen as a social norm or social exclusion, and can result in self-censorship.

Generally a cordon sanitaire is intended to uphold democratic norms and liberal democracy, promote stable governments, and prevent the normalization of extremist, hateful, and/or authoritarian ideology, though the political tactic has been criticized for it being potentially undemocratic, ineffective, and/or for potentially causing more political polarization. In addition, a cordon sanitaire can cause gridlock and can bolster a populist party's "anti-establishment" and/or "outsider" narrative.

== Examples by country ==
=== Australia ===
The right-wing populist One Nation party came to prominence in the late 1990s after its founder, Pauline Hanson, had been dropped from the conservative Liberal Party ticket for her more extreme views on race. A "put One Nation last" policy for recommended vote preferencing was instituted by the Howard government, joining the Labor Party in doing so, after his party suffered during the 1998 Queensland state election, thus starting a period of exclusion in federal politics by the two major parties. However, with a rise of populist sentiment in the 2020s, the Liberals ended this firewall, which signalled to voters that it was acceptable to switch their vote. As of 2026, the two right-leaning parties have been in direct competition for opposition status.

=== Austria ===
After Jörg Haider became leader of the Freedom Party of Austria in 1986, all other parties refused to cooperate with them until 2000 when the first Schüssel government was formed. This coalition government would last from 2000 to 2005, and a second coalition government would last from 2017 to 2019.

=== Belgium ===
Beginning in the late 1980s, the term was introduced into the discourse on parliamentary politics by Belgian commentators. At that time, the far-right Flemish nationalist Vlaams Blok party began to make significant electoral gains. Because the Vlaams Blok was considered a racist group by many, the other Belgian political parties committed to exclude the party from any coalition government, even if that forced the formation of grand coalition governments between ideological rivals. Commentators dubbed this agreement Belgium's cordon sanitaire. In 2004, its successor party, Vlaams Belang changed its party platform to allow it to comply with the law. While no formal new agreement has been signed against it, it nevertheless remains uncertain whether any mainstream Belgian party will enter into coalition talks with Vlaams Belang in the near future. Several members of various Flemish parties have questioned the viability of the cordon sanitaire.

In French-speaking Belgium, a policy exists called the cordon sanitaire médiatique, where far-right politicians are banned from live media appearances such as interviews and debates. The ban has also affected more mainstream right-wing parties such as the N-VA.

In Flanders, no media ban exists, though there is still a political cordon sanitaire against the far-right Vlaams Belang.

=== Canada ===
In Canada, resistance to the formation of coalition governments among left-of-centre parties has been attributed to an unwillingness to be seen as collaborating with the Bloc Québécois, which advocates for Quebecois independence. However, during the 2008–2009 Canadian parliamentary dispute, an agreement was made where the Bloc Québécois would provide supply and confidence to a potential coalition government formed by the Liberal Party and New Democratic Party. That government was never formed, as the Conservative Party minority government ultimately retained the confidence of the House.

=== Czech Republic ===
The Communist Party of Bohemia and Moravia is effectively excluded from any possible coalition because of a strong anti-Communist presence in most political parties, including the Czech Social Democratic Party. This policy on national level remained up until 2018, when the KSČM supported Andrej Babiš' cabinet. In recent years the policy has become moot, as the party has lost support and no longer has any presence in the legislature. On a regional level, the KSČM still remains excluded from coalitions (e.g. after the 2020 regional elections, this policy forced the Czech Pirate Party and the Civic Democratic Party to form coalitions with the ANO 2011 in Ústí nad Labem, Zlín and Moravia-Silesia).

A cordon sanitaire was also placed around Miroslav Sládek's national conservative party Rally for the Republic – Republican Party of Czechoslovakia while it was active in the Czech Parliament between 1992 and 1998. When any of its members was set to speak, other deputies would leave the Chamber of Deputies.

=== European Union ===
All European Parliament political groups declared cordon sanitaire on far-right Identity and Democracy group in the Ninth European Parliament, elected in 2019.

Some (though not all) of the Non-Inscrits members of the European Parliament are unaffiliated because they are considered to lie too far on the right or left of the political spectrum to be acceptable to any of the party groups.

Following the formation of the Patriots for Europe and Europe of Sovereign Nations groups in 2024, a cordon sanitaire was declared by most political groups in the Tenth European Parliament. However, the cordon sanitaire was broken when the European People's Party sided with the European Conservatives and Reformists, Patriots for Europe and Europe of Sovereign Nations in supporting a resolution recognising Edmundo Gonzalez as legitimate President-elect of Venezuela.

=== Estonia ===
In Estonia, the Constitution Party and Centre Party have been excluded from participation in ruling coalitions at a national level until leadership change. Differing interpretations of the Soviet occupation between 1940 and 1990 and attitudes towards Vladimir Putin's current United Russia government in the Russian Federation are often cited as reasons to conclude coalition talks with other parties, even if said parties are perceived to be on the radical right. The cordon is not absolute; the Centre Party of Estonia has briefly participated in three coalition governments in 1995, 2002–2003 and 2005–2007. The cordon was renewed in 2007, due to Edgar Savisaar's attitudes toward the Bronze Night. In 2016 Jüri Ratas of Centre became Prime Minister of Estonia, effectively ending any cordon around the party.

In Estonia, the cordon also was set up against the Conservative People's Party of Estonia between 2015 and 2019.

=== France ===
The policy of non-cooperation with National Rally, together with the majoritarian two-round electoral system, leads to the permanent underrepresentation of the FN in the National Assembly. For instance, the FN won no seats out of 577 in the 2002 elections, despite receiving 11.3% of votes in the first round, as no FN candidates won a first-round majority and few even qualified (either by winning at least 12.5% of the local vote with 25% turnout or by being one of the top two finishers with less) to go on to the second round. In the 2002 presidential election, after the Front National candidate Jean-Marie Le Pen unexpectedly defeated Lionel Jospin in the first round, the traditionally ideologically opposed Socialist Party encouraged its voters to vote for Jacques Chirac in the second round, preferring any other candidate to Le Pen. In 2017 election, and 2022 election his daughter and party successor Marine Le Pen reached the second round of the presidential election; both the Socialist Party and the Republicans encouraged votes for her opponent Emmanuel Macron.

Nonetheless, the policy of cordon sanitaire applied against the National Rally (RN) has faded since 2011 when Marine Le Pen became party leader: her "detoxification" efforts that have led to a greatly improved image of the party, as repeatedly confirmed by polling numbers, and the fall of the left-right cleavage since Macron's election in 2017 are considered to be key components of the French cordon sanitaire's dwindling.

In 2022, the cordon sanitaire strategy symbolically broke twice, first in the parliamentary elections when Macron's coalition refused to openly endorse left-wing candidates facing RN candidates in the second round, in part helping the party to achieve a record number of elected MPs (89 out of 577, winning 55% of runoffs against left-wing candidates), and second, when 2 RN members of the National Assembly were elected as vice presidents of the Chamber. Additionally, due to RN being the largest opposition party in the Assembly, members from the party were designated or elected in key parliamentary roles (such as Caroline Colombier, an RN MP, who was designated by the centrist President of the lower house Yaël Braun-Pivet as the only opposition member of the National Assembly to sit in the parliamentary Intelligence Committee).

Furthermore, since the formation of the left-wing NUPES coalition in May 2022, the notion of cordon sanitaire has moved away from the notion of a cross-party policy designed to beat far-right parties and candidates (the "republican front") to a notion of an electoral strategy applied, alternatively or jointly, to both political "extremes" on the left (namely, Mélenchon's La France Insoumise) and the right (Le Pen's RN or Zemmour's Reconquête party). In the same way, talks about a "republican arch" (Macron's centrist coalition, LR, PS, Greens and Communists), as opposed to the "extremes" (RN on the right and LFI on the left), have emerged following the 2022 French legislative elections, especially coming from Macron's political side.

Such a strategy being applied to left-wing parties as well as right-wing parties reminds of the policy of cordon sanitaire applied to the French Communist Party and to the gaullist Rally of the French People between 1947 and 1958 under the Fourth French Republic.

=== Germany ===
The Social Democratic Party of Germany was excluded until the beginning of World War I (Burgfriedenspolitik). The SPD was even banned by the Anti-Socialist Laws in the end of the 19th century.

After German reunification, East Germany's former ruling party, the Socialist Unity Party of Germany (Sozialistische Einheitspartei Deutschlands, or SED), reinvented itself first (in 1990) as the Party of Democratic Socialism (PDS) and then (in 2005 before the elections) as The Left, in order to merge with the new group Labour and Social Justice – The Electoral Alternative that had emerged in the West. In the years following 1990, the other German political parties have consistently refused to consider forming a coalition with the PDS/Left on a federal level (which was possible in 2005 and 2013), while on state levels, so-called red-red coalitions with the SPD were formed (or red-red-green). The term cordon sanitaire, though, is quite uncommon in Germany for coalition considerations.

A strict political non-cooperation is only exercised against right-wing parties, such as the Republicans, and even the Republicans have exercised a cordon against the neo-Nazi The Homeland. Since 2013, the established major parties have refused to form state-level coalitions with the new right-wing populist party Alternative for Germany (AfD). Brandmauer (firewall) is the term most often used in Germany to refer to this non-cooperation policy against the AfD.

In February 2025, the Christian Democratic Union of Germany put forward a non-binding motion, taking AfD votes into account, in the Bundestag to push through a on the detention of undocumented foreigners at borders. This was the first time since 1945 that the cordon sanitaire had been broken in Germany. This event provoked large-scale demonstrations across Germany, with between 160,000 and 250,000 people in Berlin on February 2, and over 220,000 demonstrators in several of the country's major cities the day before.

=== Israel ===
Between 1984 and 1988, there was a cordon sanitaire against the Kahanist party Kach. Famously, Likud prime minister Yitzhak Shamir walked out of the Knesset floor during Meir Kahane's speeches. The cordon ended in 1988 after the party was outlawed and disbanded, and cordons of various levels have been enforced on its successor parties. These cordons were mostly limited to cooperation within the National Union and its successor coalitions until 2019, when then-prime minister Benjamin Netanyahu orchestrated Otzma Yehudit's involvement in an electoral coalition in hopes of securing a parliamentary majority of supporters.

The Joint List and its component parties—Hadash, Balad, Ta'al, Ma'an, and (formerly) Ra'am—were under a de facto cordon sanitaire, primarily for not supporting Zionism. Following the 2021 Israeli legislative election, the conservative Ra'am, which had left the joint list and run on its own, entered into coalition with a number of predominantly Zionist parties to form the thirty-sixth government of Israel.

=== Italy ===
The Italian Communist Party (PCI) and the Italian Social Movement (MSI) were excluded from Christian Democracy-led coalition governments during the Cold War. Only during the Zoli government, the second Segni government, and the Tambroni government (1957–1958; 1959–1960) and the Historic Compromise (1976–1979), Christian Democracy relied on either the MSI or the PCI. The end of the Cold War along with the Tangentopoli scandal and Mani pulite investigation resulted in a dramatic political realignment that saw the fall of the First Italian Republic and gave rise to the Second Italian Republic.

=== Latvia ===
In Latvia, the Latvian Russian Union, For Stability! and Social Democratic Party "Harmony" have been excluded from participation in ruling coalitions at a national level. The cordon against the Harmony party remains up to this day.

=== Lithuania ===
In Lithuania, the Communist Party of Lithuania (CPSU) was not a party with which other parties would cooperate on the national level. The situation would exist from March 1990 to August 1991, when the CPL (CPSU) was banned. A similar cordon was in place between 2002 and 2006, when all other parties refused to cooperate with the Liberal Democratic Party in the Seimas and municipal councils. Another similar cordon existed against the Way of Courage between 2012 and 2016.

=== Netherlands ===
In the Netherlands, a parliamentary cordon sanitaire was put around the Centre Party (Centrumpartij, CP) and later on the Centre Democrats (Centrumdemocraten, CD), ostracising their leader Hans Janmaat. During the 2010 Cabinet formation, Geert Wilders' Party for Freedom (Partij voor de Vrijheid, PVV) charged other parties of plotting a cordon sanitaire; however, there never was any agreement between the other parties on ignoring the PVV. Indeed, the PVV was floated several times as a potential coalition member by several informateurs throughout the government formation process, and the final minority coalition under Mark Rutte between Rutte's People's Party for Freedom and Democracy (VVD) and the Christian Democratic Appeal received parliamentary support by the PVV. The coalition collapsed after PVV withdrew its support in 2012. Since then, all major parties refuse to cooperate with PVV. Since the split of the Forum for Democracy in 2020, all major parties but PVV also refuse to cooperate with FvD.

The cordon sanitaire against the PVV ended after the 2023 Dutch general election, when the VVD, New Social Contract (NSC), and Farmer-Citizen Movement (BBB) formed a government with PVV.

=== Norway ===
Starting in the 1970s, all parliamentary parties consistently refused to formally join into a governing coalition at state level with the right-wing Progress Party. The cordon was broken in 2013, when the Conservative Party did so. In some municipalities however, the Progress Party cooperates with many parties, including the centre-left Labour Party.

=== Portugal ===
Ever since the conservative party Chega gained parliamentary representation in 2019, there have been several attempts to establish a cordon sanitaire, with most parties refusing to associate with them. During the 2024 Portuguese legislative election campaign, center-right candidate Luís Montenegro popularized the expression "Não é não" (No means no) to reiterate unwillingness to negotiate with Chega.

=== Slovenia ===
In Slovenia liberal, centre-left and left-wing parties led by LMŠ leader and later Prime Minister Marjan Šarec declared a de facto cordon sanitaire and excluded the Slovenian Democratic Party (SDS) from coalition negotiations following the 2018 parliamentary election due to its xenophobic and divisive rhetoric and policy, which was based primarily on the opposition to illegal migration and the discreditation of political opponents. The same parties also claimed that SDS was illegally financed by foreign donations via its media (mostly capital from Hungarian companies close to Viktor Orbán, with whom SDS closely cooperates) and by loans from foreign national Dijana Đuđić, who personally financed the party with almost half a million euros. The SDS won the election, but all parties from centre to left wing rejected its invitation to start negotiations.

After a governmental crisis in 2020, the social liberal Modern Centre Party and the Democratic Party of Pensioners of Slovenia formed a coalition with the SDS.

=== Spain ===
In 2003, a majority of the Parliament of Catalonia consisting in the left-of-centre and pro-decentralisation PSC, ERC and ICV-EUiA parties reached a coalition agreement that included vetoing the right-of-centre, centralist People's Party in both subnational and national instances. This point of the agreement was later criticised by the resulting President of Catalonia Pasqual Maragall. The coalition agreement was reedited in 2006, but by 2010 the then PSC candidate José Montilla said his party wouldn't seek a new agreement with ERC.

=== Sweden ===
In Sweden, the political parties in the Riksdag adopted a policy of non-cooperation with the far-right Sweden Democrats (SD). However, there have been exceptions where local politicians have supported resolutions from SD.

In October 2018, the Sweden Democrats went into a governing coalitions with the Moderate Party (M) and the Christian Democrats (KD) for the first time in Staffanstorp Municipality, Sölvesborg Municipality, Herrljunga Municipality and Bromölla Municipality. In Bromölla, the coalition felt apart in 2020, while new coalitions with the SD emerged in Svalöv Municipality (2019), Bjuv Municipality (2020) and Surahammar Municipality (2021).

However, in March 2019, Christian Democratic leader Ebba Busch announced that her party was ready to start negotiations with the Sweden Democrats in the Riksdag. Since 2018, the SD has formed governing coalitions in municipal councils with the Moderate Party and Christian Democrats. The opening of M and KD to SD and the January Agreement led to the dissolution of The Alliance (Swedish: Alliansen). After the Liberals stopped supporting the minority government they stopped with ruling out a coalition with SD.

Following the 2022 Swedish general election, Ulf Kristersson formed a minority government consisting of the Moderate Party (M), Christian Democrats (KD) and Liberals (L). The Sweden Democrats (SD) remained outside the government but provided confidence and supply support under the Tidö Agreement (Swedish: Tidöavtalet), which made the party a formal cooperation partner and granted it full and equal influence in six designated policy areas. This marked the end of the centre-right parties' exclusion of SD from national-level government cooperation.

A 2024 study found that when the mainstream parties in Sweden ended the cordon sanitaire approach towards the Sweden Democrats, voters increasingly saw the Sweden Democrats as legitimate and as less threatening to democracy. When the mainstream parties re-established a cordon sanitaire, it did not shift voters' perceptions of the Sweden Democrats.

=== Turkey ===
Pro-Kurdish parties like the Peoples' Democratic Party (HDP) are under a cordon sanitaire because of the accusation of cooperation with the banned Kurdistan Workers' Party (PKK) which is currently designated as a terrorist organisation by the European Union, UK, USA, Turkey and other countries. Kurdish parties that have allegedly cooperated with terrorist organisations have also been banned by the Constitutional Court of Turkey several times in the past. This process of banning led the Kurdish Movement to be more willing to solve problems in favour of democratisation of Turkey and regionalism, rather than separating the country.

During the 1990s, Islamist parties of the Millî Görüş movement were excluded from government formation and were banned several times with the exception of the so-called "Refahyol" (1996–1997). The cordon sanitaire was lifted when the more moderate Justice and Development Party (AKP) in 2002 rose to power and the more radical heir Felicity Party joined the Nation Alliance in 2018.

=== United Kingdom ===
In the United Kingdom, the far-right British National Party is completely ostracised by the political mainstream. Prominent politicians, including former Prime Minister and Conservative Party leader David Cameron, have been known to urge electors to vote for candidates from any party except the BNP. The Eurosceptic UK Independence Party (UKIP), which has itself been labelled as far-right, has categorically refused even limited cooperation with the BNP. Although the party has never held more than 60 of the some 22,000 elected positions in local government, it is generally agreed by all parties that the BNP should be excluded from any coalition agreement on those councils where no single party has a majority. When two BNP candidates were elected to the European Parliament at the 2009 election, the UK Government announced that it would provide them both with only the bare minimum level of support, denying them the ready access to officials and information that the other 70 British MEPs received. In 2017 the cordon was alleged to have been broken in Pendle, when the council fell under no overall control, but this was denied by the Labour and Liberal Democrat council leaders.

With the rise of Reform UK in 2024, a right-wing to far-right party led by Nigel Farage, multiple parties ruled out the possibility of working with them. In the 2026 Scottish Parliament election, Reform won 17 seats, tying with Labour for second place, but was excluded from government talks by SNP First Minister John Swinney.

== See also ==
- Cartel party theory
- Centrism
- Decommunization
- Defensive democracy
- Denazification
- Grand coalition
- List of banned political parties
- Non-LDP and non-JCP Coalition
- Pluralistic ignorance
- Pseudoconsensus
- Republican Front (French Fifth Republic)
- Social exclusion
- Trasformismo
- Uniparty
- United front
