= 1982 Dutch general election =

- 8 September 1982
- All 150 seats in the House of Representatives; 76 seats needed for a majority
- Turnout: 80.98% (▼6.05pp)
Party	Leader	Vote %	Seats	+/–
PvdA	Joop den Uyl	30.40	47	+3
CDA	Dries van Agt	29.39	45	−3
VVD	Ed Nijpels	23.08	36	+10
D'66	Jan Terlouw	4.26	6	−11
PSP	Fred van der Spek	2.28	3	0
SGP	Henk van Rossum	1.90	3	0
CPN	Ina Brouwer	1.79	3	0
PPR	Ria Beckers	1.66	2	−1
RPF	Meindert Leerling	1.51	2	0
CP	Hans Janmaat	0.83	1	+1
GPV	Gert Schutte	0.82	1	0
EVP	Cathy Ubels-Veen	0.69	1	+1
This lists parties that won seats. See the complete results below.
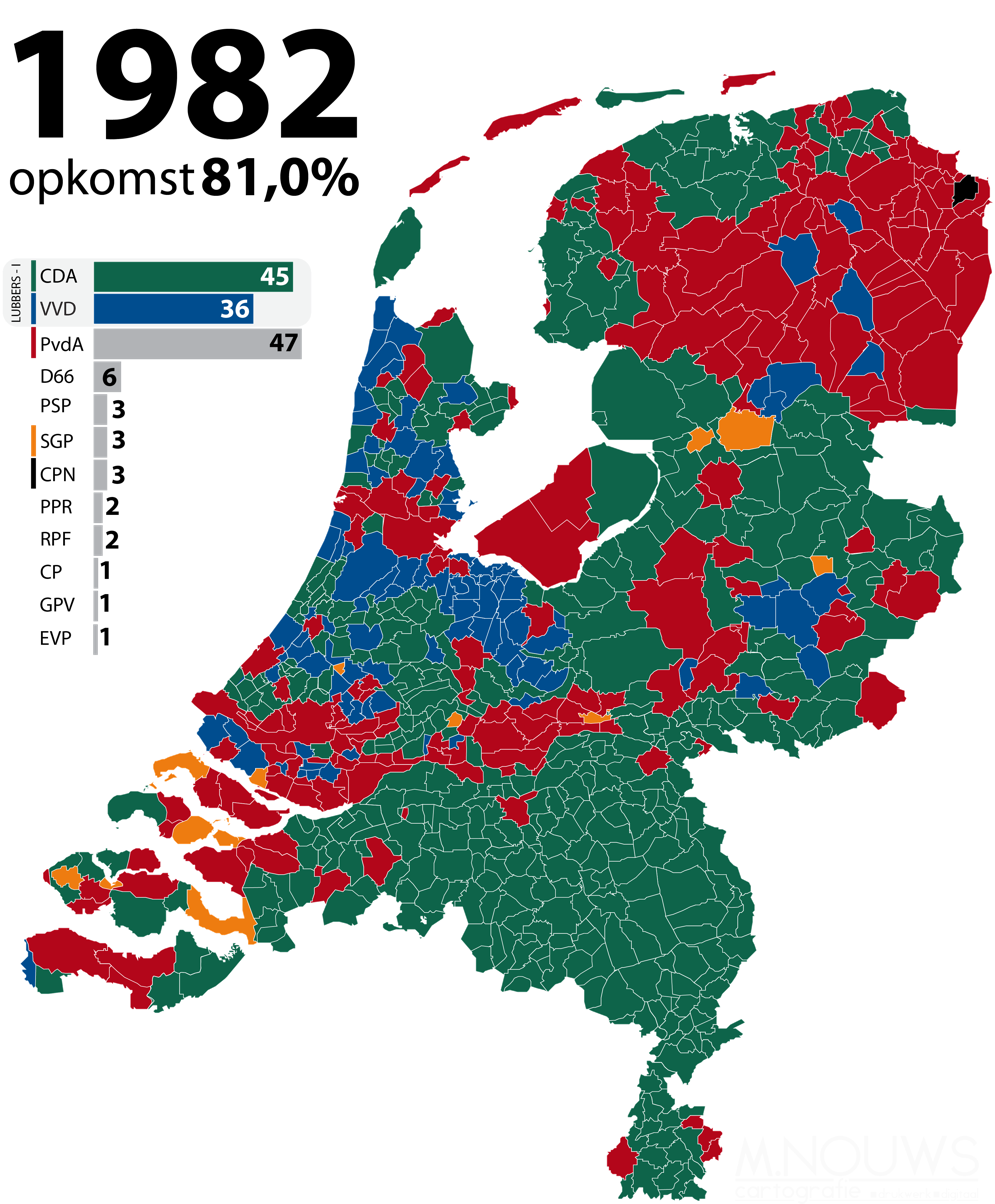
Most voted-for party by municipality
Cabinet before	Cabinet after
Third Van Agt cabinet CDA–D'66	First Lubbers cabinet CDA–VVD

Early general elections were held in the Netherlands on 8 September 1982. The Labour Party emerged as the largest party, winning 47 of the 150 seats in the House of Representatives; however, this would be the last time it did so until 1994.

The Centre Party received 0.8% of the vote, winning one seat, which was taken by Hans Janmaat. This was the first time since World War II that a party considered to be right-wing extremist won a seat in the Dutch parliament.

Following the election the Christian Democratic Appeal (CDA) formed a coalition government with the People's Party for Freedom and Democracy, with the CDA's Ruud Lubbers becoming prime minister.

== Results ==
Party	Votes	%	Seats	+/–
Labour Party	2,503,517	30.40	47	+3
Christian Democratic Appeal	2,420,441	29.39	45	–3
People's Party for Freedom and Democracy	1,900,763	23.08	36	+10
Democrats 66	351,278	4.26	6	–11
Pacifist Socialist Party	187,547	2.28	3	0
Reformed Political Party	156,636	1.90	3	0
Communist Party of the Netherlands	147,753	1.79	3	0
Political Party of Radicals	136,446	1.66	2	–1
Reformatory Political Federation	124,235	1.51	2	0
Centre Party	68,423	0.83	1	+1
Reformed Political League	67,163	0.82	1	0
Evangelical People's Party	56,466	0.69	1	+1
Socialist Party	44,959	0.55	0	0
Democratic Socialists '70	31,047	0.38	0	0
Right-wing People's Party	21,987	0.27	0	0
Roman Catholic Party of the Netherlands	12,689	0.15	0	0
God with Us	3,157	0.04	0	0
Dutch People's Union	1,632	0.02	0	0
Progressive Party for the Preservation of Work, Environment and Society	250	0.00	0	New
Small Party	127	0.00	0	0
Total	8,236,516	100.00	150	0
Valid votes	8,236,516	99.55		
Invalid/blank votes	37,115	0.45		
Total votes	8,273,631	100.00		
Registered voters/turnout	10,216,627	80.98		
Source: Kiesraad

=== By province ===
Results by province
Province	PvdA	CDA	VVD	D'66	PSP	SGP	CPN	PPR	RPF	CP	GPV	EVP	Others
Drenthe	41.1	23.7	21.8	3.9	1.3	0.2	1.3	1.3	1.7	0.2	1.6	1.0	2.0
Friesland	37.0	31.5	17.6	3.2	1.5	0.6	1.3	1.3	2.3	0.2	1.4	1.4	2.0
Gelderland	28.0	32.5	22.3	4.2	2.1	3.3	0.8	1.8	2.1	0.3	0.5	0.8	1.2
Groningen	42.2	20.9	16.9	3.4	2.3	0.2	4.2	1.7	1.8	0.2	3.8	1.3	1.3
Limburg	26.1	42.9	18.6	4.7	2.2	0.0	1.0	1.9	0.2	0.2	0.1	0.1	0.7
North Brabant	24.6	40.1	22.3	4.6	2.2	0.5	0.8	1.7	0.4	0.4	0.1	0.3	1.0
North Holland	31.6	21.7	27.2	4.5	3.7	0.4	4.3	2.0	0.9	1.4	0.3	0.6	1.3
Overijssel	28.3	36.3	18.1	3.9	1.3	2.6	1.0	1.4	2.8	0.3	2.1	0.7	0.9
South Holland	33.1	22.9	25.1	4.2	2.0	3.4	1.5	1.4	1.8	1.7	0.6	0.7	1.6
Southern IJsselmeer Polders	35.6	18.5	25.5	5.1	2.2	0.5	4.0	2.0	1.4	1.8	0.9	1.0	1.4
Utrecht	25.3	27.3	27.6	4.5	2.6	2.8	1.4	1.9	2.2	0.8	1.4	0.9	1.1
Zeeland	27.9	27.4	23.2	4.1	1.3	8.2	0.6	1.4	2.3	0.5	1.2	0.9	1.5
