= Kedichem =

- Village
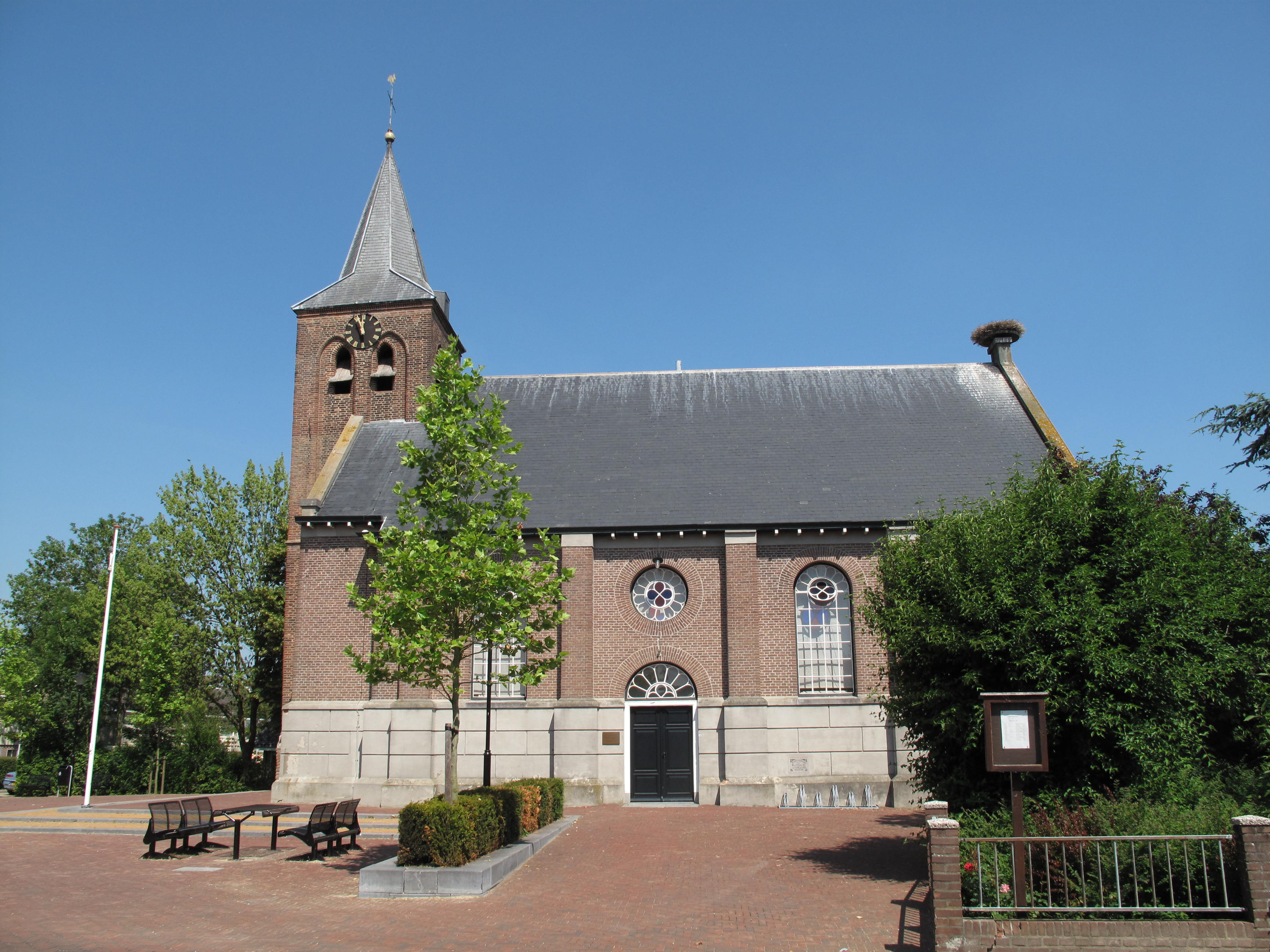
- Church of Kedichem

- Coat of arms

- Location in the Netherlands Kedichem (Netherlands)
- Coordinates: 51°51′36″N 5°3′1″E
- Country: Netherlands
- Province: Utrecht
- Municipality: Vijfheerenlanden

Area
  - Total: 0.22 km^{2} (0.085 sq mi)
- Elevation: 1 m (3.3 ft)

Population (2021)
  - Total: 550
  - Density: 2,500/km^{2} (6,500/sq mi)
- Time zone: UTC+1 (CET)
  - Summer (DST): UTC+2 (CEST)
- Postal code: 4247
- Dialing code: 0183

Kedichem is a village in the Dutch province of Utrecht. It is located about 7 km northeast of the city of Gorinchem, in the municipality of Vijfheerenlanden.

The village was first mentioned between 1395 and 1396 as Kedinghen, and means "settlement of the people of Kedo (person)". In 1840, it was home 381 people. The Protestant Church was built in 1867, and was the replacement of a 15th century church.

Kedichem was a separate municipality in the province of South Holland until 1986, when it merged with Leerdam. In the same year Kedichem became nationally known in The Netherlands when activists burned down a hotel there to prevent a joined meeting of the extreme right Centre Party and Centre Democrats parties, causing a number of injuries.
