= Centre Party (Netherlands) =

Dutch political party active in the 1980s

Centre Party Centrumpartij
- Chairman: Henry Brookman; Hans Janmaat; Nico Konst; Pim Lier; Danny Segers
- Founded: 11 March 1980; 46 years ago
- Dissolved: 13 May 1986; 40 years ago
- Succeeded by: Centre Party '86
- Ideology: Dutch nationalism
- Political position: Far-right
- Slogan: "Not right-wing, not left-wing"

The Centre Party (Dutch: Centrumpartij, Dutch pronunciation: [ˈsɛntrəmpɑrˌtɛi], CP) was a Dutch nationalist, right-wing extremist political party espousing an anti-immigrant program. The party was founded by Henry Brookman in 1980 and was represented by Hans Janmaat in the Dutch House of Representatives from 1982 until he was expelled from the party in 1984 and joined the more moderate Centre Democrats. Both the CP and the CD were subject to a cordon sanitaire by the other parties in the House of Representatives. After much infighting and finally legal proceedings against the party, it was declared bankrupt in 1986. The party was soon afterward succeeded by the Centre Party '86, which became increasingly radical until it was banned in 1998.

== Party history ==
=== Foundation ===
The Centre Party was founded on 11 March 1980 by Henry Brookman, one of the founders of the short-lived National Centre Party (NCP) in 1979 (which had been dissolved the day before the founding of the CP), and a prominent member of the Dutch People's Union (NVU). In February 1980, some radical NCP members had harassed Moroccan refugees who held a hunger strike at the Moses and Aaron church in Amsterdam. This led to a conflict within the NCP. Brookman dissolved the NCP and founded the Centre Party (CP). The party contested the 1981 elections unsuccessfully, winning just 0.1% of the vote, the same as the Dutch People's Union.

=== In Parliament (1982–1984) ===
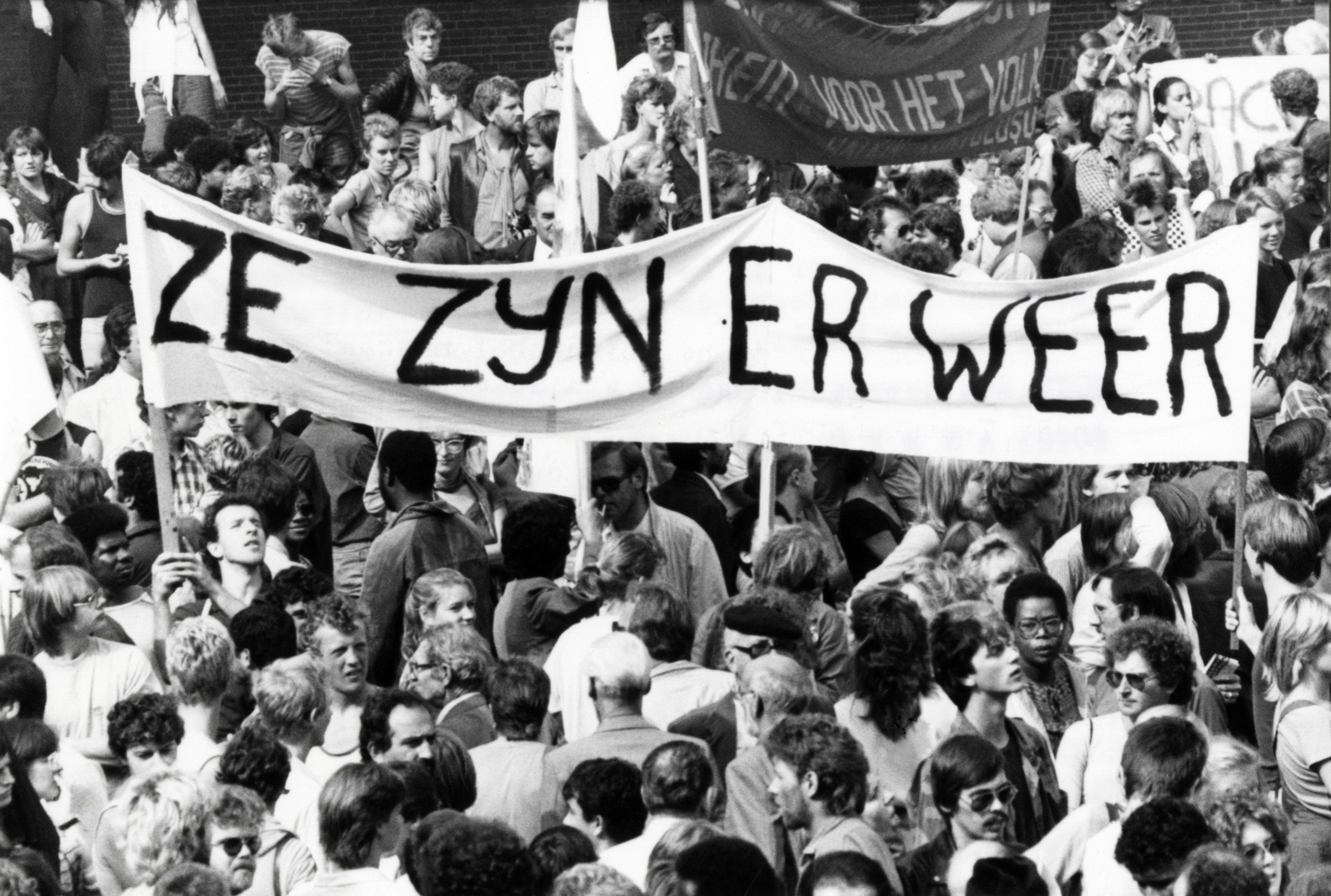
"They are back": a demonstration outside parliament in The Hague against the entrance of the Centre Party in the House in 1982.

In the 1982 election, the party won 0.8% of the vote, and one seat, which was taken by Hans Janmaat. This was the first time since the Second World War that a party considered to be right-wing extremist had won a seat in parliament. Janmaat soon took over the leadership of the party, helped by the small membership of the party, his political background in mainstream political parties, and as Brookman had to move into the background due to pressure from his employer.

In the following years, the party continued its growth, and claimed 3,500 members in 1984. It was highly successful in elections, for instance winning almost 10% of the vote in the 1983 local elections in Almere, and 2.5% of the vote nationwide in the 1984 European elections.

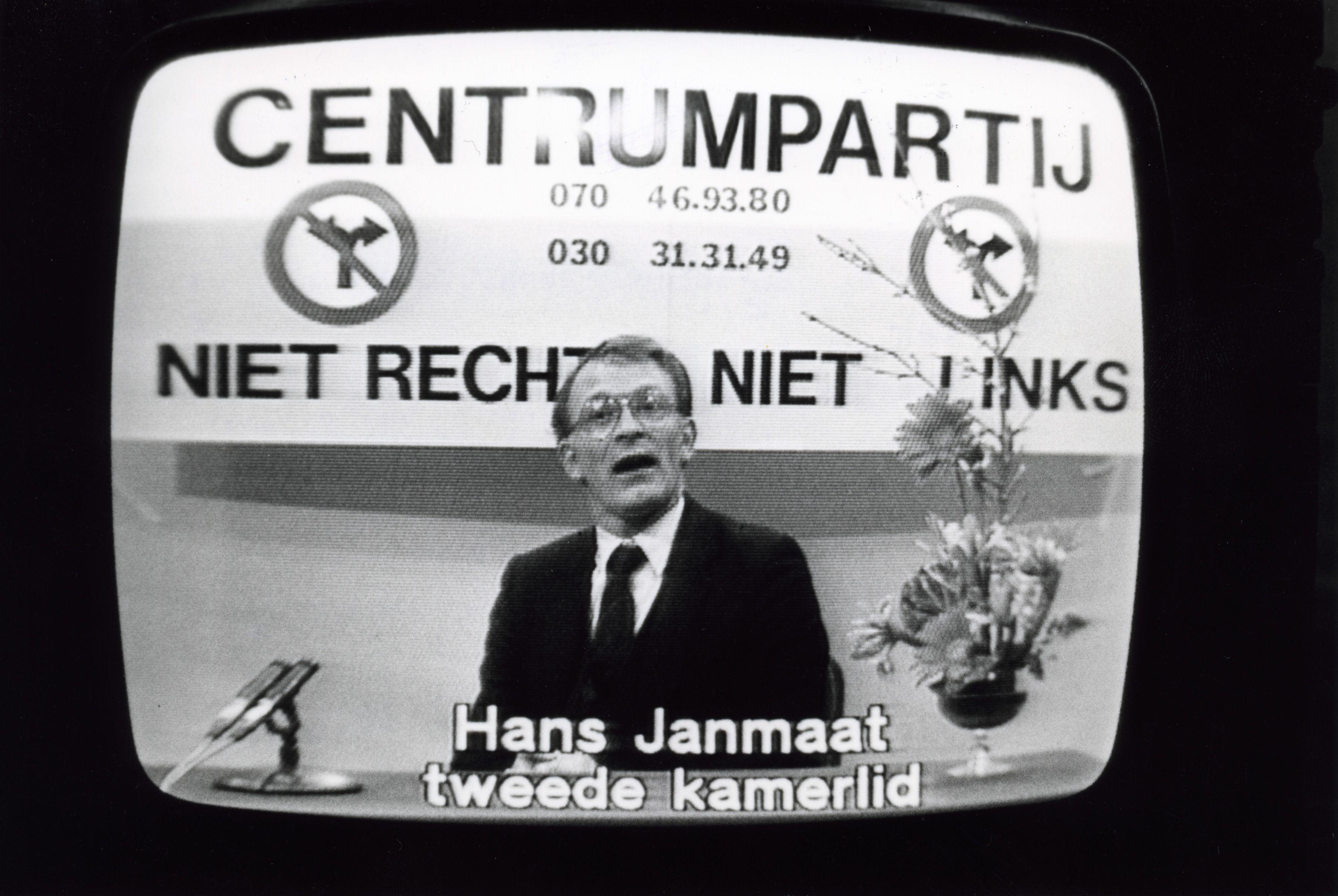
Janmaat, leader of the Centre Party, during a television broadcast for political parties (February 1984)

Conflict soon erupted however, between the party leadership led by Nico Konst and Henk de Wijer, and the parliamentary section, of Janmaat and his assistants. Janmaat was accused of financial and personal improprieties, while Janmaat in turn accused the party leadership of neo-Nazi sympathies and political and organisational incompetence. While Janmaat had thought that by steering a more moderate course the CP would be able to attract more voters at the polls, he was expelled from the party by the party leadership. Janmaat then joined the recently founded Centre Democrats (CD) and kept his seat in parliament. The CP became even more isolated, and suffered from disruptive internal struggles, which were very costly. In 1986 the CP and CD organized a reconciliation meeting in Kedichem, which was turned into a disaster by radical anti-fascists. A group of these anti-fascist activists set the hotel where the meeting was located on fire, causing several heavy injuries.

The party had some moderate success in local elections of March 1986, winning 6 seats. The new optimism in the party was shattered however, when party leader Albrecht Lier defected from the party and joined the Centre Democrats in May. The CP, like the CD, was unable to obtain a seat in the 1986 election, but nevertheless won 0.4% of the vote, compared to the mere 0.1% of the CD.

=== Dissolution ===
By the 1986 election, the party was disintegrating rapidly, with the party membership after the split counting a mere 100 persons, and most of the leading party members having gone over to the CD, or left politics. The party was officially declared bankrupt on 13 May 1986, after being fined a sum of money it was not able to pay. The party re-organized itself under the name Centre Party '86 (CP'86) a week later. They were never able to obtain any seats in national elections since then, and were eventually abrogated in 1998 by a Dutch court, because of the racist and xenophobic statements of its party board at a 1995 meeting. The radical neo-Nazi wing of the new party expelled the moderate nationalist wing, and several of the latter members founded the People's Nationalists Netherlands in 1997, which later became the New National Party.

== Ideology ==
The CP saw itself as defending the rights of native Dutch people in the face of mass immigration. After it lost its parliamentary representation in 1984, the party continued in 1986 under the name Centre Party '86. The new party became even more radicalized.

The party's initial manifesto was titled "not left, not right," and combined right-wing, left-wing and green political positions. Its tenth point contained its immigration stance; "The Netherlands is not an immigrant country, so put a stop to the stream of foreigners." Together with the history of some of the party's early members, this point in the program was the main background for portraying the CP as a "right-wing extremist" party in the media. The party itself fiercely rejected any accusations of racism and fascism.

== Election results ==
House of Representatives
Election year	# of total votes	% of overall vote	# of seats won
1981	12,242	0.1	0 (out of 150)
1982	68,423	0.8	1* (out of 150)
1986	36,741	0.4	0 (out of 150)

European Parliament
Election year	# of total votes	% of overall vote	# of seats won
1984	134,877	2.55	0 (out of 25)

* In 1984, the party's sole representative in parliament, Hans Janmaat, became an independent MP.

== Party leaders ==
- Henry Brookman (1980–1982)
- Hans Janmaat (1982–1984)
- Nico Konst (1984–1985)
- Albrecht "Pim" Lier (1985–1986)
- Danny Segers (1986)

== Bibliography ==
- Mudde, Cas (2003). The ideology of the extreme right. Manchester University Press. ISBN 978-0-7190-6446-3.
