= Centre Democrats (Netherlands) =

Defunct right-wing political party in the Netherlands

Centre Democrats Centrum Democraten
- Leader: Hans Janmaat (1984–2002)
- Chairperson: Hans Janmaat (1984–2002)
- Secretary-General: Wil Schuurman (1987–2002)
- Leader in the House of Representatives: Hans Janmaat (1989–1998)
- Founder: Hans Janmaat
- Founded: 7 November 1984
- Dissolved: 18 April 2002
- Split from: Centre Party
- Headquarters: The Hague
- Membership (mid-1990s): 1,000–4,000
- Ideology: Nationalism; Cultural conservatism Social conservatism Euroscepticism
- Political position: Right-wing to far-right
- Colors: Vermilion; White; Cobalt blue
- Slogan: Not Right. Not Left

The Centre Democrats (Dutch: Centrum Democraten, CD) was a political party in the Netherlands. Founded in 1984 by members who split out from the far-right Centre Party (CP), the Centre Democrats was joined one month later by the only CP Member of Parliament—Hans Janmaat. Janmaat went on to become the leader of the party, which subsequently became strongly centered on his person. The newly formed Centre Democrats represented the more moderate faction of the Centre Party, but still espoused an anti-immigration and nationalist ideology. Their claims of standing in the centre of the political landscape have thus been disputed by political scientists.

The Centre Democrats did not gain enough votes for parliamentary representation in the 1986 general election, but Janmaat won back his seat after the following election in 1989. In 1994 he was joined by two additional representatives won by the party. The CD was subject to a cordon sanitaire by the other parties in Parliament, although some parties sought to confront it following its 1994 success. The CD failed to win any seats in the 1998 election, and it fell into disarray until it was finally dissolved in 2002.

== History ==
=== Early years (1984–1989) ===
The Centre Democrats was founded on 7 November 1984 by a few low-key members who broke away from the Centre Party (CP). On 5 December, the only Member of Parliament for the Centre Party, Hans Janmaat, changed party to the Centre Democrats and became its seventh member. Janmaat believed that by steering a more moderate course, the Centre Party would attract more voters at the polls, but was expelled by the party's hardliners. In an attempt to appear more mainstream than the Centre Party, the new Centre Democrats' slogans were more moderate and less explicit. As opposed to the Centre Party's Eigen volk eerst ("Our People First"), the Centre Democrats' manifesto used the Dutch proverb Oost West Thuis Best ("There's No Place Like Home"). After Janmaat joined the Centre Democrats, the party became known as "his" party. Despite widespread media coverage generated by Janmaat's reputation, party membership remained small in the first few years.

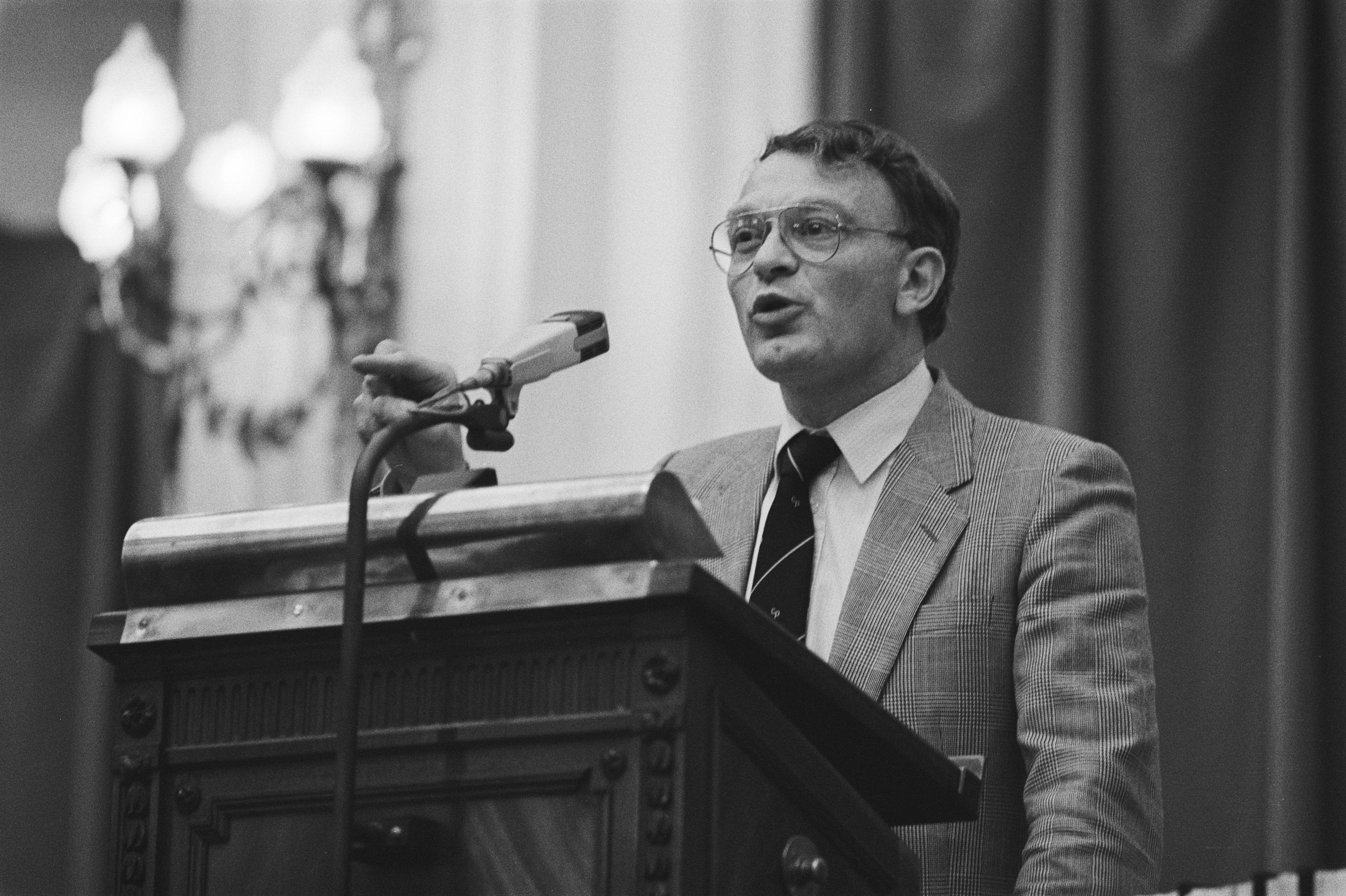
Hans Janmaat as a Member of Parliament in early 1984 (while still representing the Centre Party).

During its early years, the Centre Democrats received extensive media attention on two occasions. The first occurred when the Centre Democrats and Centre Party met on 29 March 1986 in Kedichem. A group of anti-fascist activists believed that the two parties were planning to merge, and firebombed the hotel where the meeting was held. The venue was severely damaged, Janmaat narrowly escaped death and the party secretary Wil Schuurman had one leg amputated after jumping from a window to escape the conflagration.

Janmaat's attempt to be reinstated as a teacher at his old school following his failed re-election to parliament led to the second media frenzy. Although he was legally permitted to go back to his job, the protests of some students and parents due to his reputation as a "racist", led him to be bought off by the court from pursuing a return to his old job. Unable to go back to his former job, Janmaat returned to politics. Taking advantage of Janmaat's profile, the Centre Democrats contested the 1986 general election under the name Lijst Janmaat/Centrumdemocraten, but gained just 0.1% of the vote and no parliamentary seat. The Centre Democrats failed in its attempt to win votes from the Centre Party, which gained 0.4% of the vote but also did not win a seat.

=== In parliament (1989–1998) ===
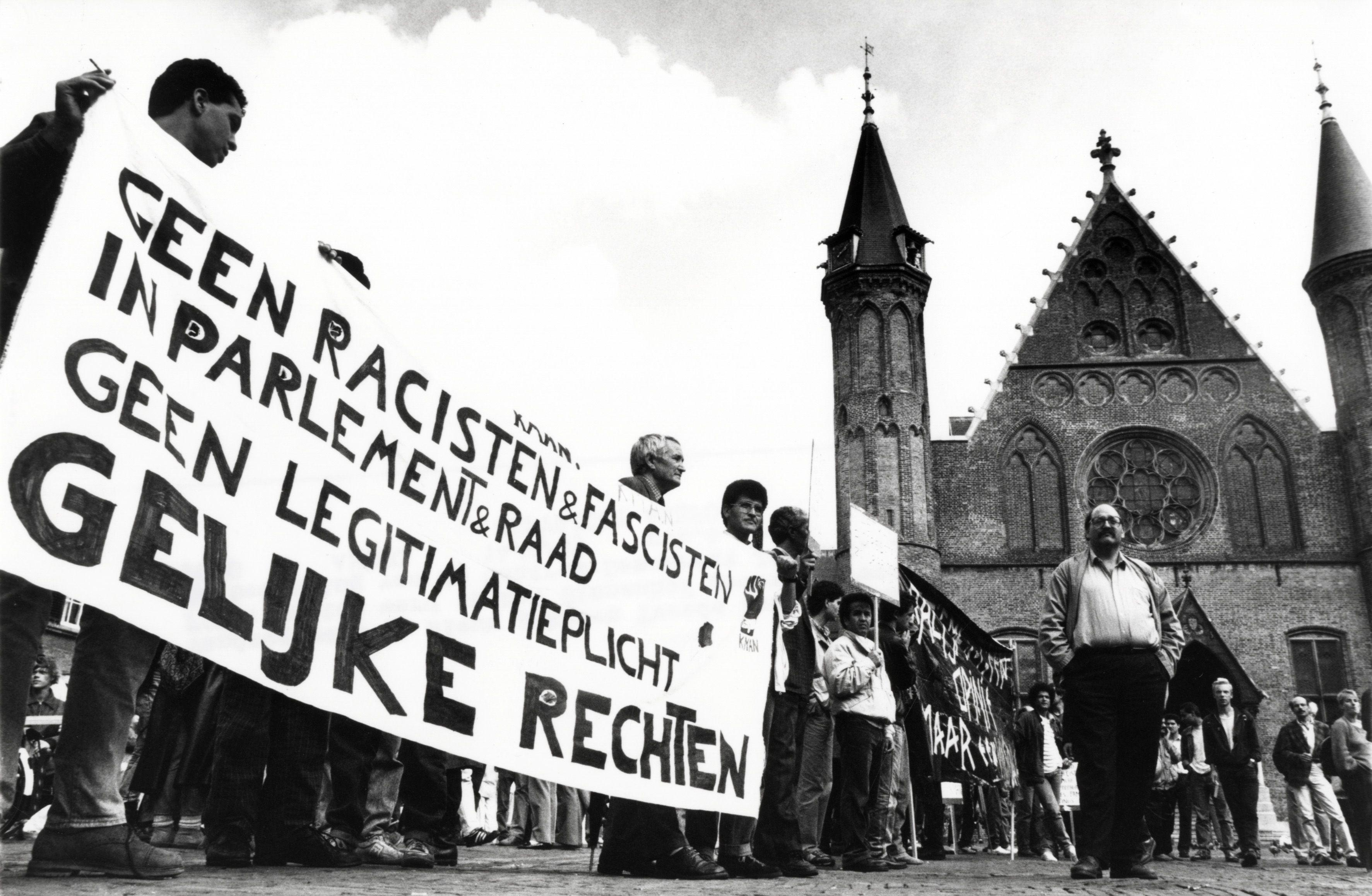
Demonstration against Janmaat during the swearing in of the House of Representatives in 1989.

Following the 1986 election, the Centre Democrats worked on improving both its image and its grassroots support. The strategy paid off with Janmaat winning a seat in the House of Representatives in the 1989 general election. By contesting the election in all nineteen constituencies, the party won the right to state-sponsored television and radio time but still had no more than 300 registered members. In the 1990 local elections the Centre Democrats won eleven seats, then, in the 1991 provincial elections, three seats in the provincial parliament.

Electoral success overtook the party and Janmaat began to make controversial statements in the media. Based on his conviction that high office should be restricted to third-generation Dutch nationals, he suggested that several cabinet ministers, including Justice Minister Ernst Hirsch-Ballin who was of Jewish descent, and Agriculture State Secretary Dzsingisz Gabor who was of Hungarian descent, should be removed from the Dutch leadership. This marked the start of prosecutions of Centre Democrats party members on charges of racism, as well as the decision by the other parties in Parliament and government to place a cordon sanitaire around the party.

The cordon sanitaire turned out to be counterproductive with the Centre Democrats winning 77 seats in the 1994 local elections and gaining representation in almost every city where it fielded a candidate. Large cities were strongholds of the party, winning more than 10% of the vote in Rotterdam. It became the fifth largest Dutch political party. After the elections, however, scandal loomed over the Centre Democrats, largely because of its weak organization and lack of active party members. Many of its previously won local seats became vacant after a while, as elected representatives failed to take them up, joined or founded other parties, left the party or left politics altogether. Before the 1994 general election opinion polls predicted that the party could win more than five seats in the House of Representatives. However, media reports claiming that some newly elected local members had extremist pasts damaged the Centre Democrats' prospects. A secret recording broadcast on national television one week before the election showed an Amsterdam council member bragging about having set immigrant centers on fire in the early 1980s. In the election that followed, the Centre Democrats won 2.5% of the vote and three seats in the House of Representatives (Janmaat was joined by Wil Schuurman and Cor Zonneveld), well below earlier expectations. Janmaat claimed that the relatively poor result was a result of an anti-CD campaign in the media. Due to its growth, and questions arising amongst the other parties over the development of a multicultural society, political opponents began to confront the Centre Democrats directly rather than maintain a strict cordon sanitaire around it.

Despite attempts to broaden their appeal, the issue of foreigners remained central to the party's rhetoric. Janmaat was convicted of "inciting racial hatred" by the Dutch courts for speaking out against multiculturalism. His conviction later came to be seen as unwarranted by mainstream observers. Janmaat and Schuurman, who were to marry in 1996, dominated the party. With Schuurman's son head of the party office, the Centre Democrats became almost a family affair. Janmaat remained skeptical of initiatives outside his own control, and expelled multiple local council members from the party. While much of this was due to local cooperation—unauthorized by the Centre Democrats leadership—with the more radical Centre Party '86 (CP'86), Janmaat later agreed to coordinate joint demonstrations with it. The cooperation soon fell apart and Janmaat distanced himself from CP'86 as the 1998 election approached.

In the 1995 provincial elections, in the face of competition from four new ethnocentric competitors, none of which won a seat, the Centre Democrats did not increase its three-seat presence in the provincial parliament. In the 1998 local elections the Centre Democrats lost all but one of its seats, having contested the election in just around half of the municipalities it contested in 1994. In the 1998 general election two months later, the party lost all its seats in Parliament. This was as a result of the Centre Democrats's failure to benefit from increased attention on immigration issues, its years of internal infighting, and new legislation directed mainly against the far-right, which had raised the number of signatures per district required in order to contest elections.

=== Demise (1998–2002) ===
After the 1998 election, Janmaat became increasingly worried by legal pressure, believing that the Centre Democrats could become the government's next target after CP'86 was officially banned in 1998. He founded the "Conservative Democrats" as a potential successor party in the event that the Centre Democrats was proscribed. The new party contested the 1999 European elections as the Lijstverbinding Centrumdemocraten/Conservatieve Democraten, a supposed two-party cooperation, where the two names in reality represented the same party. It won only 0.5% of the vote in the election, a showing widely seen as the last spasm of a dying party. Janmaat's increasing physical exhaustion only served to exacerbate the situation. Nonetheless, with a new political climate following the September 11 attacks and the rise of Pim Fortuyn, Janmaat sought political rehabilitation in his final years. The reason was that his earlier criminal convictions arose from stating things that had now become accepted.

On 18 April 2002, only a few months before Janmaat died, the party was formally dissolved. As a result, it did not participate in the 2002 general election, where the recently emerged Pim Fortuyn List attracted votes based on an appeal similar to that of the Centre Democrats.

Although the Centrumdemocraten had already been disbanded, there was still a provincial party active in Gelderland that called itself Gelderse Centrumdemocraten and mainly used the same party logo and the same rhetoric as the Centrumdemocraten.The party name participated in the provincial elections of Gelderland in the 2011 and 2015, but on average only 0.07% and 0.06% of the votes respectively, far from enough for a seat.

== Ideology ==
After the split from the Centre Party, the ideology of the Centre Democrats was broadly similar to that of its originator, although the Centre Party became increasingly radical in the following years. The Centre Democrats did not publish a party or electoral manifesto before 1989, and until then its policies were known primarily through the small-scale distribution of pamphlets, which were almost exact copies of old Centre Party pamphlets. Like the Centre Party, the Centre Democrats claimed to be at the centre of the political spectrum, representing a "centre-democratic ideology". Nevertheless, the party focused mainly on the issue of immigration, and mainstream observers considered the party's ideology to be a populist form of nationalism.

=== Immigration and multiculturalism ===
The Centre Democrats was strongly opposed to multiculturalism and immigration. It did not, however, exclude people based on ethnicity. It spoke, initially at least, of a Dutch population rather than a Dutch ethnic community. The party remained distinct from ethnic nationalists, as it gave immigrants the choice between repatriation or assimilation. Its 1989 party program stated that "foreigners and minorities either adjust to the Dutch ways and customs or leave the country." The Centre Democrats considered Dutch culture to be under threat from foreigners, and that Muslims in particular had come to the Netherlands with the intention of taking over or dominating the country.

Also opposed to "multicultural marriages," and wanting to limit the possibility of adoptions from the Third World, the CP generally sought a return to the old Dutch society with its singular Dutch culture. According to political scientist Cas Mudde, the party's ideology is best described as civic nationalism. Nevertheless, by 1994 the party had moved more towards ethnic nationalism by asserting that its program began "from the indissoluble unity and solidarity of the Dutch ethnic community [...] based on the common history and the culture that originated from that history."

=== Foreign policy ===
The Centre Democrats opposed any limitation of the sovereignty of the Dutch state and was thus skeptical of the European Union and European integration, seeing the Maastricht Treaty as one of many international defeats inflicted on the Dutch government. While it generally described international organizations such as the United Nations as superfluous and inefficient bureaucracies, it supported NATO as a means of keeping the West safe from Communism. In its 1998 program, the Centre Democrats included a call for the "reunification with Flanders and other Dutch-speaking territories", thereby promoting the idea of a Greater Netherlands.

=== Society ===
While the party did not originally place heavy emphasis on ethical issues, it did see the family as the cornerstone of society. By 1994, it had become more conservative, stressing law and order as well as traditional morals and values. Over the years, it also sought to make divorce more difficult, particularly for families with children. The party also lent much space to discussing the AIDS virus, which it put in the context of a moral crisis and moral relativism that it considered to only be solvable by returning to traditional morality.

=== Economic ===
The party's economic policies did not deviate substantially from the generally supported mixed economy of the Netherlands. Its other demands did not have a strong ideological coherency. Supporting a generous welfare state for the Dutch people, it was otherwise sceptical of state interventionism in the economy; notably by high taxes which would hinder private initiative, or overspending on subsidies.

== Organisation ==
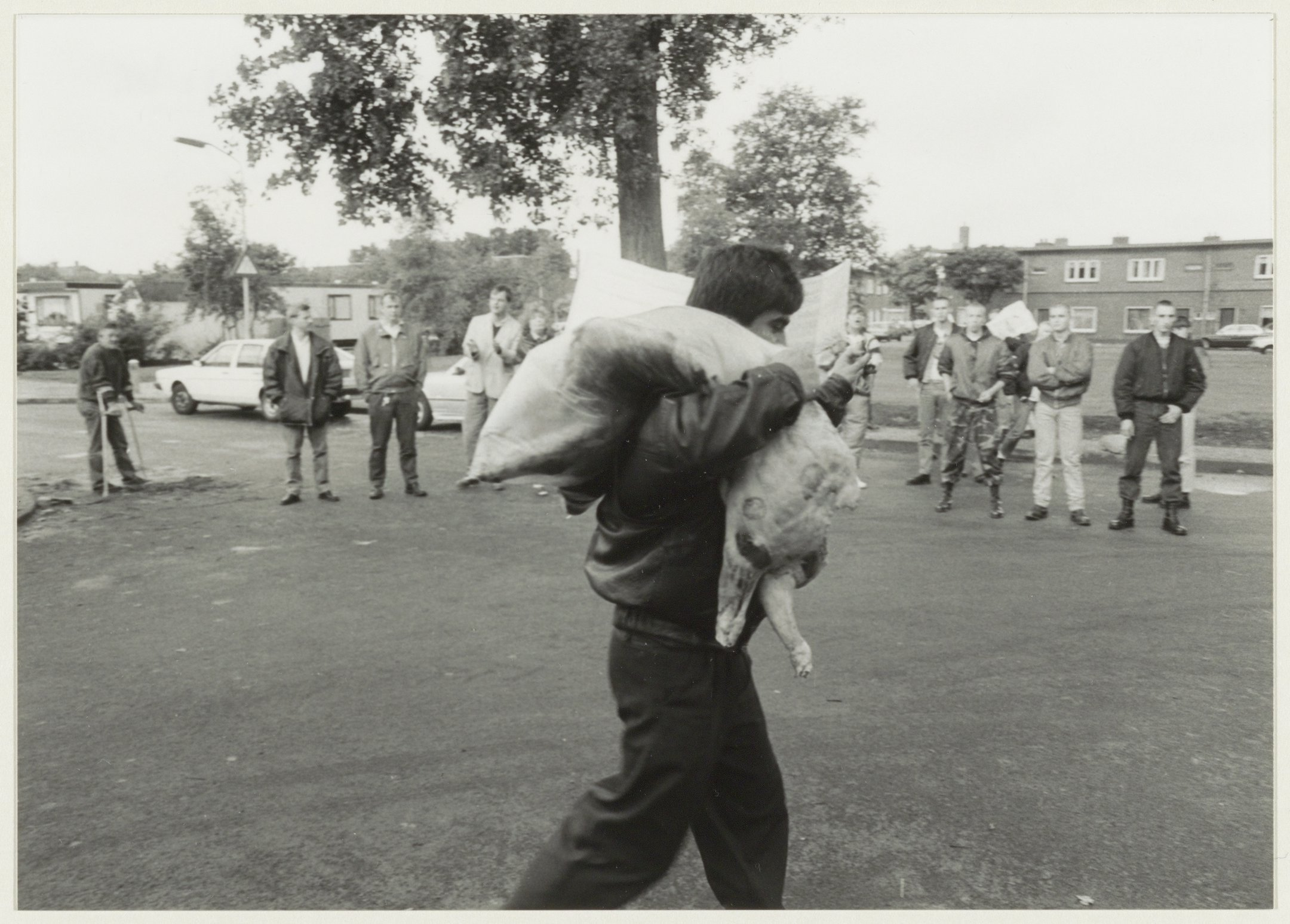
Supporters of the Center Democrats protests against the muslim Feast of Sacrifice

The original scientific bureau, or think tank, of the Centre Democrats was the Foundation for the Scientific Elaboration of the Centre Democratic Ideology (Dutch: Stichting Wetenschappelijke Onderbouwing Centrumdemocratische Ideologie, SWOCI). In 1992 its name was changed to the Thomas Hobbes Foundation (Dutch: Thomas Hobbes Stichting), after Janmaat's favorite political philosopher Thomas Hobbes.

The Young Centre Democrats (Dutch: Jonge Centrumdemocraten), became the youth organization of the Centre Democrats, having originally been founded as the youth wing of the Centre Party in the early 1980s. It was later succeeded by the CD Youth (Dutch: CD-Jongeren), which was based almost exclusively in the Haarlem area. The Centre Democrats did not attract many youngsters, nor did it establish a particularly active youth organization. Most of the far-right youth tended to join CP'86.

Over time the Centre Democrats published a variety of party papers of varying quality. The Centrumtaal and the Middenkoers were the original newspapers first published in 1986. Although the former was intended for general party news, and the latter aimed at a more intellectual readership, they did not differ much in content. By 1987–1988, Centrumtaal was more or less succeeded by CD-info, and Middenkoers by CD-actueel. CD-actueel was distributed for the last time in 1993, with CD-info succeeded by the CD-Nieuwsbrief in 1997, although in later years it had been published less and less frequently.

== International relations ==
The CD regarded itself as related to other European "patriotic parties", but its official contact was limited to the German People's Union, the French National Front and the Belgian Vlaams Blok. The party regularly attended annual meetings of the German People's Union and the National Front, and Janmaat spoke of his good contacts with the latter party's leader Jean-Marie Le Pen. Relations with the Vlaams Blok created a conflict of interest given VB's arguably better contacts with CP'86, the Centre Democrats' main rival in the Netherlands. Even so, the Centre Democrats maintained official contacts domestically with both the Centre Party and its successor, the CP'86.

== Election results ==
=== House of Representatives ===
House of Representatives
Election	Votes	%	Seats
1986	12,277	0.1	0
1989	81,527	0.9	1
1994	220,621	2.4	3
1998	52,226	0.5	0

=== European Parliament ===
European Parliament
Election	Votes	%	Seats
1989	40,779	0.8	0
1994	43,300	1.0	0
1999	17,740	0.5	0

== Bibliography ==
- Lucardie, Paul (1998). "The Netherlands: The Extremist Center Parties". In Betz, Hans-Georg; Immerfall, Stefan (eds.). The new politics of the Right: neo-Populist parties and movements in established democracies. Palgrave Macmillan. pp. 111–142. ISBN 978-0-312-21338-1.
- Mudde, Cas (2003). "Centrumdemocraten". The ideology of the extreme right. Manchester: Manchester University Press. pp. 123–141. ISBN 978-0-7190-6446-3.
