= Operation Crescent Wind =

2001 military operation in Afghanistan

- Part of the War in Afghanistan (2001–2021)
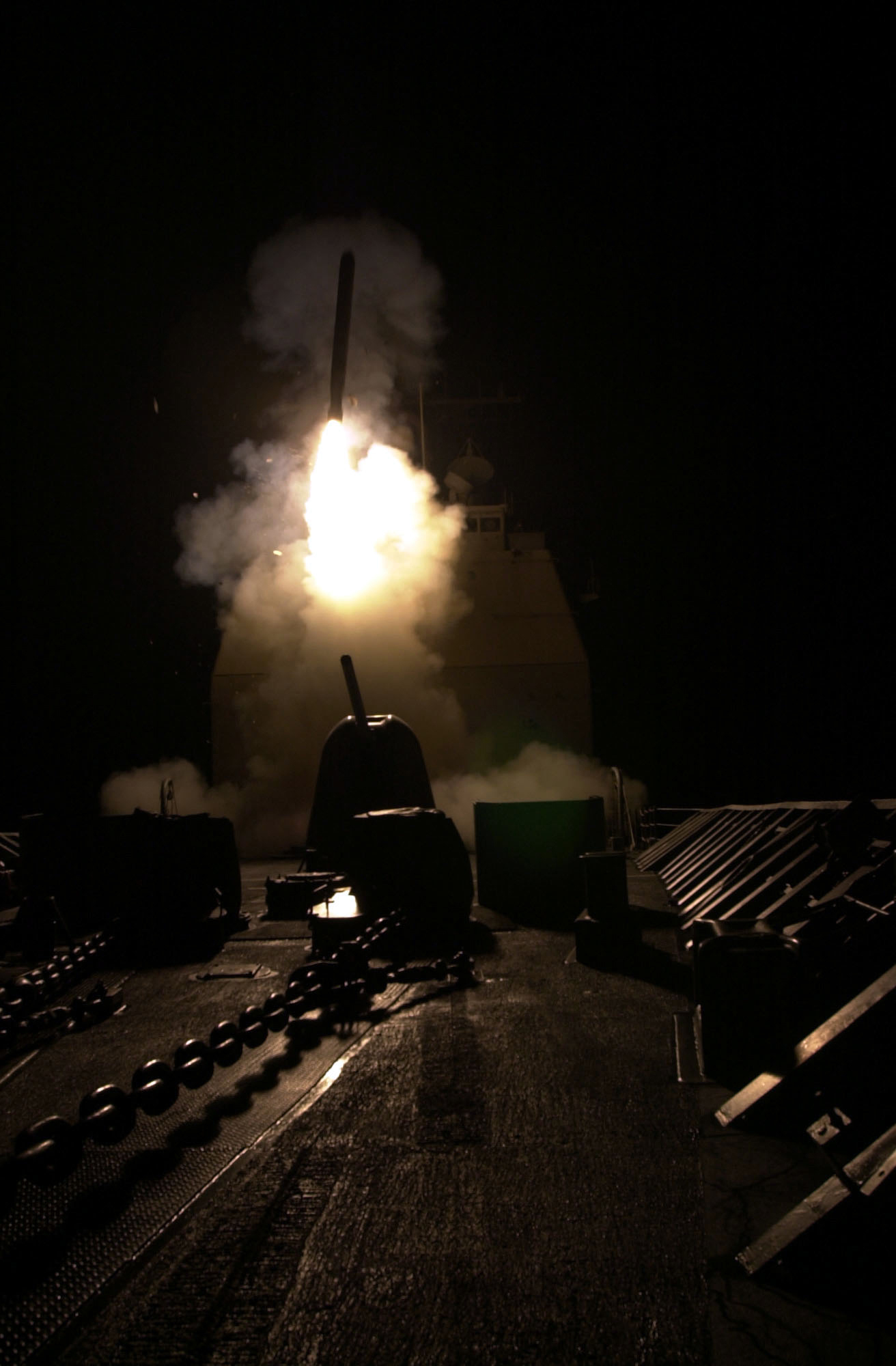
- A Tomahawk cruise missile is launched from the USS Philippine Sea in a strike against al-Qaeda training camps and Taliban military installations in Afghanistan on 7 October 2001
| Date | 7 October 2001 – 17 December 2001 |
| Location | Afghanistan |
| Result | US–UK victory |

Belligerents
| United States; United Kingdom | Islamic Emirate of Afghanistan |

Commanders and leaders
| (United States) Tommy Franks (United States) Charles F. Wald | (Afghanistan) Muhammad Omar |

Units involved
| United States Air Force; 509th Bomb Wing; 28th Bomb Wing; 2nd and 917th Bomb Wings; United States Navy; CVW-11; VF-213; VAW-117; CVW-8; VF-41; VF-14; VAQ-141; Royal Navy Royal Air Force | |

Casualties and losses
| 3 killed (friendly fire) | |
- 3,100–3,600 civilian deaths

Operation Crescent Wind was the codename for the American and British air campaign over Afghanistan from 7 October to 17 December 2001. The bombing campaign was aided by British special forces troops on the ground to provide targeting information for airstrikes.

The campaign significantly weakened the Taliban, paving the way for offensives by the Northern Alliance to take place in November which quickly overran Taliban-controlled regions of Afghanistan.

== Opening strikes ==
The initial strikes were launched from Whiteman Air Force Base, Missouri with two B-2 bombers of the 509th Bomb Wing taking off on the night of 7 October, followed by two on the nights of 8 October and 9 October as well. These bombers refueled with the help of KC-10 and KC-135 tankers of the 60th and 349th Mobility Wings along with the 319th Reconnaissance Wing with coordination by the Eighteenth Air Force, first doing so off the coast of California, followed Hawaii, Guam, and the Strait of Malacca, then a fifth refueling near Diego Garcia before striking their targets in Afghanistan with GBU-31 JDAMs. After delivering their ordnance, the B-2s turned back to receive a final refueling over the Indian Ocean before landing at Andersen Air Force Base. At this point the crews were swapped with the replacement crews who flew the B-2s back to Whiteman in Missouri. It took 30 hours of flying just to reach targets in Afghanistan, with the original crews flying 44 hours and 20 minutes total at the longest, and the aircraft operating for 70 hours in total. The operation remains the longest combat bombing sortie in history.

Initial targets included command and control nodes, Taliban Air Defenses, as well as the modest Taliban Air Force, with the airports of Kabul, Herat, Kandahar, Zaranj and Mazar-i-Sharif being targeted. The Taliban were believed to have had 40 pilots capable of getting some 50 MiG-21s and Su-22s airborne, though there was less concern about these as traditional interceptors as there was about them eventually being loaded with explosives and used to suicide bomb American encampments.

The opening night's B-2 strike was followed by ten B-52s and either five or eight B-1Bs of 28th Bomb Wing from Andersen Air Force Base striking with both JDAMs and Mk 82 unguided bombs, with F-14Ds of VF-213 from CVW-11 of the USS Carl Vinson participating in the strikes with GBU-16s and 12s, while also armed with AIM-54Cs, AIM-7Ms and AIM-9Ls to provide top cover in the low chance of Taliban interceptors. Assistance was also provided by E2Cs from VAW-117. While some of the aircrews on the first night reported encountering AAA and MANPAD SAM fire, Taliban aircraft never left the ground, and virtually the entirety of their air force was destroyed in the first night.

A few hours after the initial strikes, the USS Carl Vinson was joined by the USS Enterprise with more F-14As of VF-41 and EA-6Bs of VAQ-141 from CVW-8. and later by HMS Trafalgar and HMS Triumph, who launched cruise missiles along with the Vinson and Enterprise.

== Reaction ==
On 18 October 2001, Tom Pitstra, a GroenLinks member of the Dutch House of Representatives, dissented from his party's support for the invasion of Afghanistan after the bombardment of Kabul led to civilian casualties. Both GroenLinks and the ruling cabinet supported the invasion. Due to his break from his party, Pitstra was censured and barred from GroenLinks' party list in the 2002 Dutch general election.
