= Tom Pitstra =

Dutch politician

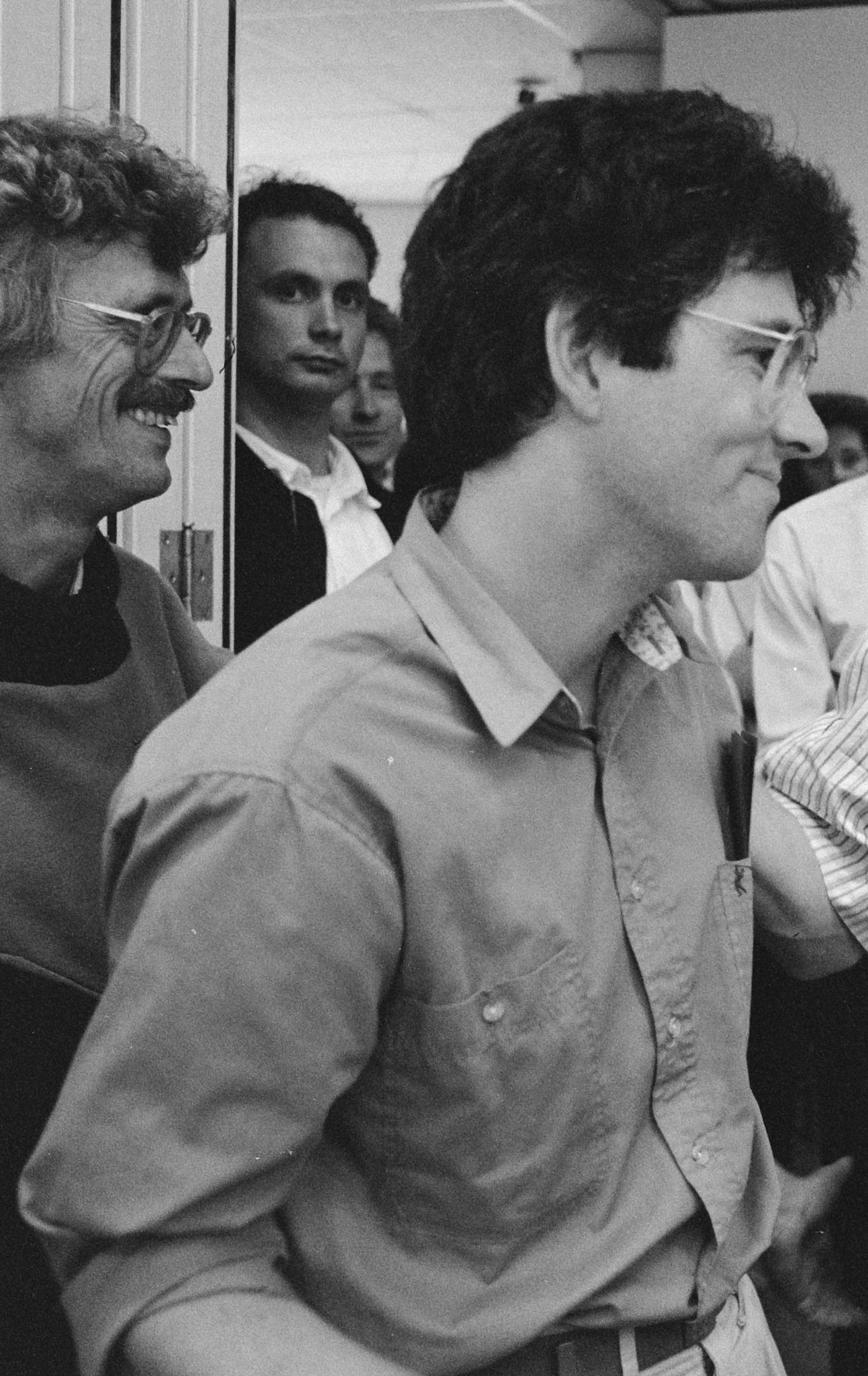
Tom Pitstra (1989)

Tom Pitstra (born 6 August 1949, Leeuwarden) is a Dutch politician.

On 18 October 2001, Pitstra dissented from his party (GroenLinks)'s support for the invasion of Afghanistan after the bombardment of Kabul led to civilian casualties. Both GroenLinks and the ruling cabinet supported the invasion. Due to his break from his party, Pitstra was censured and barred from GroenLinks' party list in the 2002 Dutch general election.
