= 2002 Dutch general election =

- 15 May 2002
- All 150 seats in the House of Representatives; 76 seats needed for a majority
- Turnout: 79.06% (▲5.71pp)
| Party | Leader | Vote % | Seats | +/– |
|---|---|---|---|---|
| CDA | Jan Peter Balkenende | 27.93 | 43 | +14 |
| LPF | Pim Fortuyn (assassinated) | 17.00 | 26 | New |
| VVD | Hans Dijkstal | 15.44 | 24 | −14 |
| PvdA | Ad Melkert | 15.11 | 23 | −22 |
| GL | Paul Rosenmöller | 6.95 | 10 | −1 |
| SP | Jan Marijnissen | 5.90 | 9 | +4 |
| D66 | Thom de Graaf | 5.10 | 7 | −7 |
| CU | Kars Veling | 2.54 | 4 | −1 |
| SGP | Bas van der Vlies | 1.72 | 2 | −1 |
| LN | Fred Teeven | 1.61 | 2 | +2 |
This lists parties that won seats. See the complete results below.
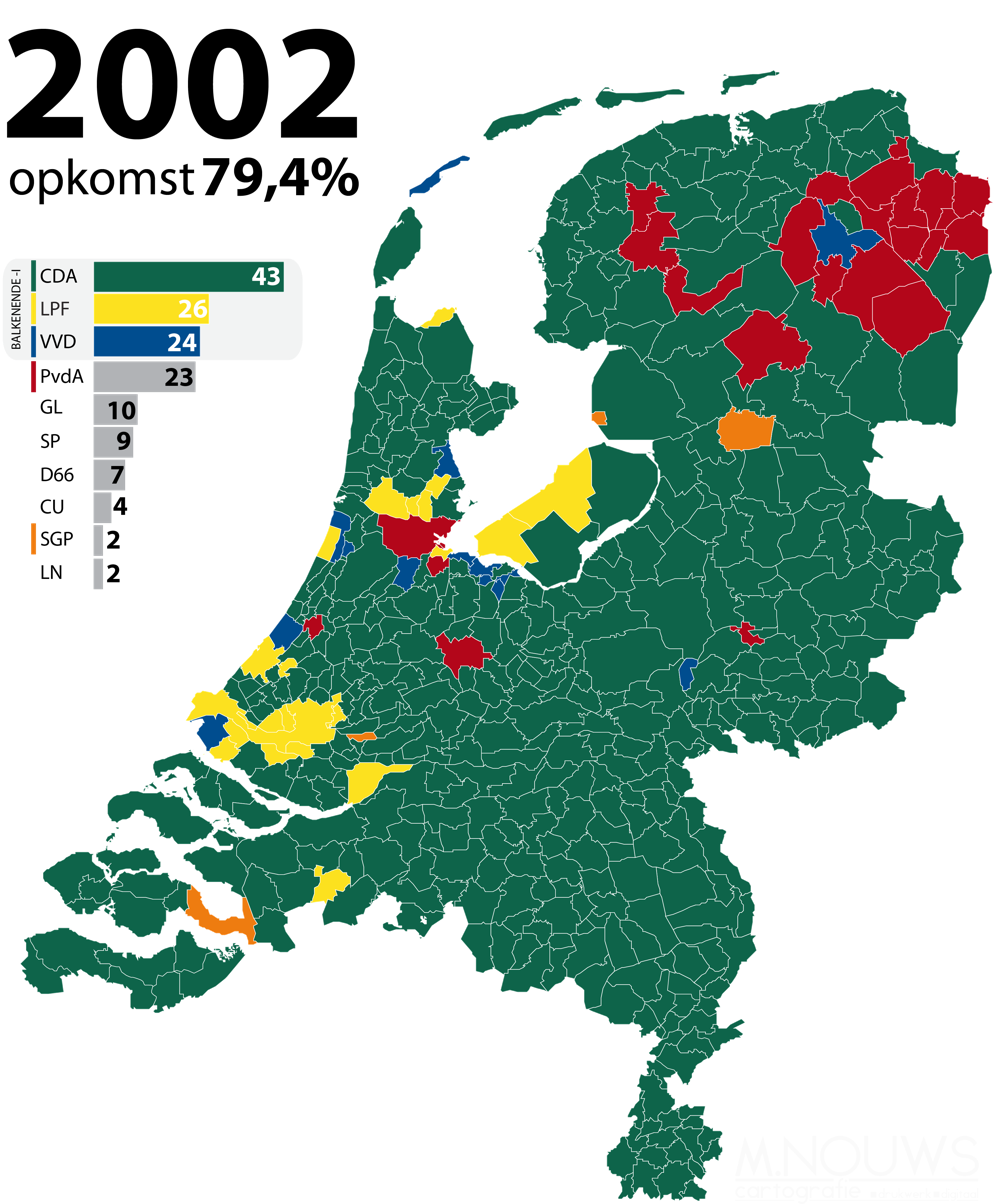
Most voted-for party by municipality
| Cabinet before | Cabinet after |
|---|---|
| Second Kok cabinet PvdA–VVD–D66 | First Balkenende cabinet CDA–LPF–VVD |

General elections were held in the Netherlands on 15 May 2002. The elections were amongst the most dramatic in Dutch history, not just in terms of the electoral results, as they were completely overshadowed by the assassination of leader Pim Fortuyn only nine days before election day.

In 1998, twice as many voters as in 1994 credited the government with improving their finances, and clear majorities approved its record, rendering the 1998 election virtually a formality. The Labour Party climbed from 24 to 29 percent of the vote and the incumbent purple coalition from 92 to 97 seats, enabling a second Kok cabinet with Labour, VVD and D66. The strong economy was expected to suffice again in 2002. In 2000, speculation surrounded whether prime minister Wim Kok, who had passed the age of 61, would seek a third term. Although three-quarters of Labour supporters still preferred him, senior figures urged renewal. Ad Melkert's 2001 spring congress speech cast him as Kok's heir despite limited public enthusiasm; only 16 percent of voters endorsed him. Kok resigned as Labour Party leader on 15 December 2001, citing a need for generational change, and formally passed leadership to Melkert.

On 20 August 2001, Pim Fortuyn, an outspoken critic of Islam, announced his candidacy, initially as lead candidate for Livable Netherlands. After a Volkskrant interview on 9 February 2002 in which he called Islam achterlijk and criticized the constitution of the Netherlands, LN expelled him. Fortuyn promptly founded the Pim Fortuyn List (LPF) and, while simultaneously heading Livable Rotterdam, secured a victory in the 6 March municipal elections, ending Labour's post-WWII supremacy in the city. National polls thereafter placed LPF close to the CDA and Labour, as established parties faltered in televised debates. Although threats escalated, Fortuyn rejected protection and, on 6 May 2002, was assassinated in Hilversum by Volkert van der Graaf. After the assassination, campaigning paused and the CDA secured a frontrunner position, thanks to the refusal of its leader, Jan Peter Balkenende, to criticize Fortuyn and emphasis on "norms and values." Late media focus on CDA momentum influenced late-deciding voters and helped the CDA outperform polls by a 12-seat margin.

The purple coalition parties Labour, VVD, and D66 all lost heavily, Labour enduring a record 22-seat loss under Melkert, who resigned that night. The CDA improved in every province, securing pluralities in all except Groningen. CDA gains in urban cities were more muted; the LPF secured pluralities in The Hague and Rotterdam while Labour retained Amsterdam. Labour inquiries blamed an excessively economistic message; party leadership was democratized and in November, members elected Wouter Bos parliamentary leader. Negotiations produced a CDA-LPF-VVD accord prioritising security, healthcare, and tighter immigration; the first Balkenende cabinet assumed office on 22 July.

== Background ==
=== Incumbent coalition wins re-election (1998) ===
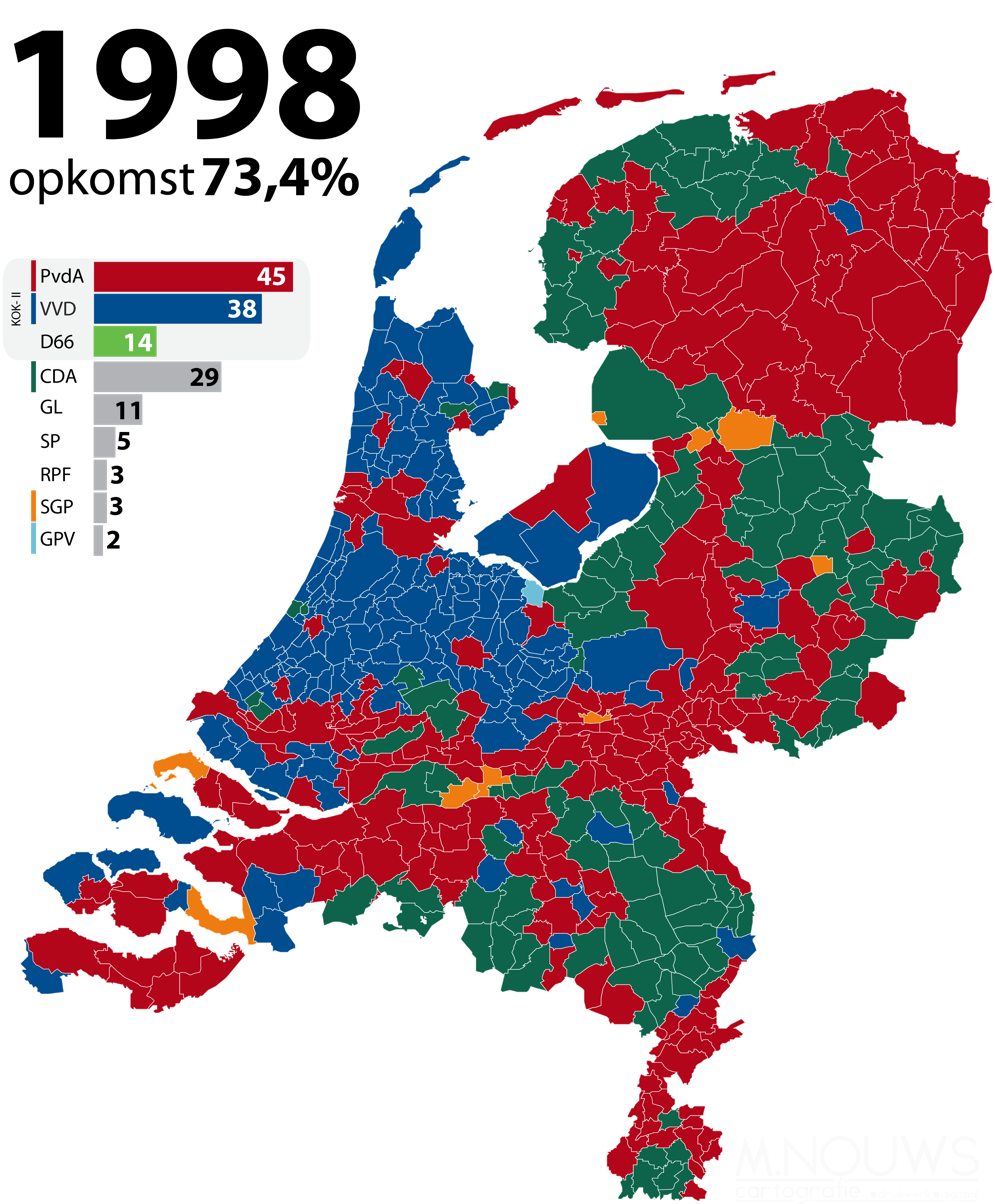
Results of the 1998 Dutch general election by municipality.

By 1998, twice as many voters as in 1994 believed that the government's performance had positively impacted their personal financial situations. Moreover, clear majorities — 58% regarding economic policy and 62% concerning employment — expressed favourable views of the government's handling of these key issues. This widespread confidence rendered the 1998 election almost a formality; public satisfaction was so pronounced that a continuation of the existing government appeared inevitable. As a result, all of the purple coalition parties, with the exception of D66, saw notable electoral gains during the general election of 6 May 1998. Prime minister Wim Kok's party, the Labour Party, won 29% of the vote, up from 24% in 1994, whereas his coalition went from 92 to 97 seats.

The formation resulted in the continuation of the Kok cabinet with the second Kok cabinet, consisting of the PvdA, VVD and D66, even though the latter was not necessary for a majority of 76 seats. Approaching the 2002 election, the coalition partners, particularly VVD and the Labour Party, anticipated replicating their earlier success by building their campaigns around the strong economic record that had served them so well in 1998.

=== Wim Kok's resignation (2000–2001) ===
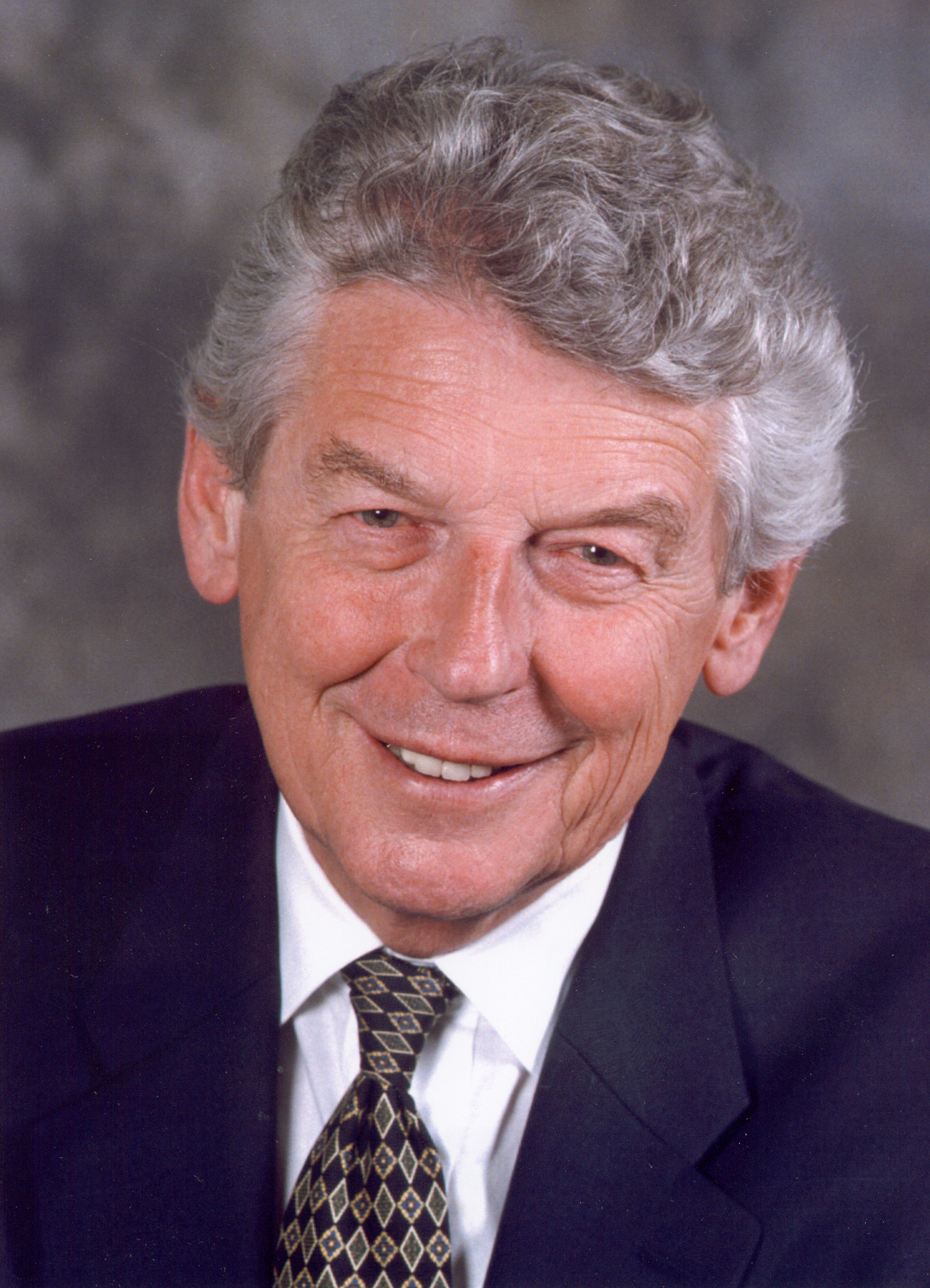
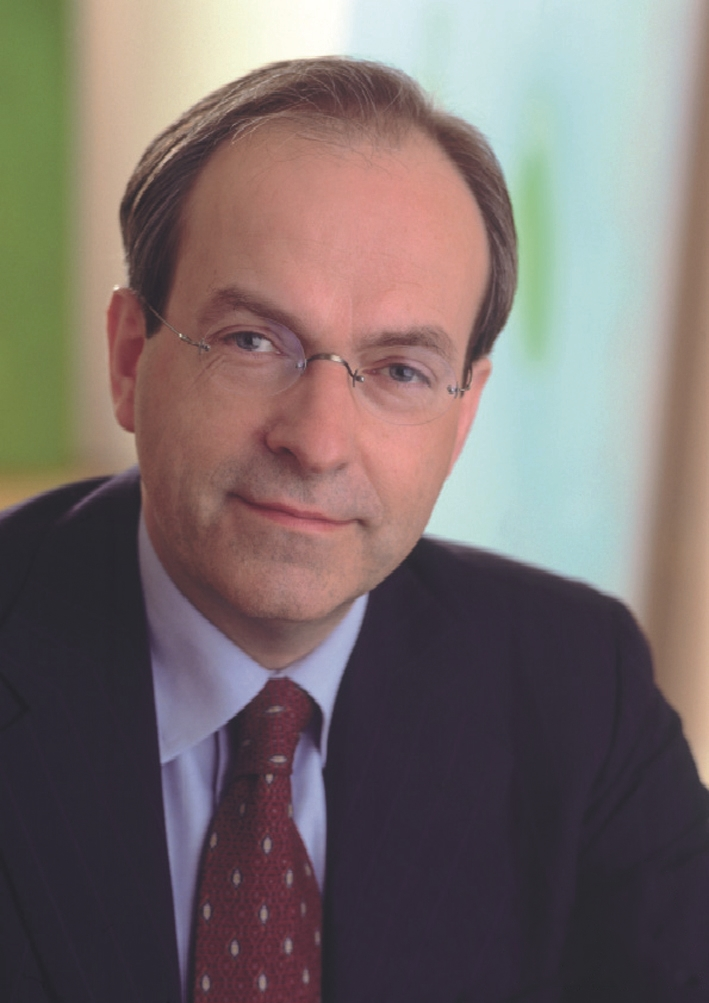
During the Labour Party congress on 15 December 2001, Prime Minister Wim Kok (left) named Ad Melkert as his successor

In 2000, speculation abounded regarding the political future of party leader and Prime Minister Wim Kok, who had by then passed the age of 61. In May, he announced he would decide the following year whether to continue as prime minister for a third term. In December, speaker of the House J. van Nieuwenhoven publicly suggested that Kok's time as Prime Minister had run its course and named Ad Melkert as a suitable successor. However, this view was not widely shared among the party's base; a poll by Intomart showed that roughly three quarters of Labour voters still preferred Kok to lead the party in the next election. Opinions within the party remained divided. Former minister Ed van Thijn publicly argued that Kok should step aside, even at the cost of electoral losses. In contrast, Minister Jan Pronk and chair candidate Olij supported Kok's continuation. Kok, for his part, remained noncommittal, stating he was not automatically a candidate for the 2002 election.

At the 2001 spring party congress, Melkert delivered a political speech that positioned him, in the eyes of many party members, as Kok's natural successor. He championed a vision of a more democratic society, contrasting liberal individualism with a renewed sense of community, asking whether society should be "every person for themselves, or do we do it together?". Party chairman Koole, recently elected, urged that leadership not be decided by acclamation but through a meaningful choice. In a May interview, Melkert openly criticised Kok's ideological leadership, suggesting that after shedding the legacy of Joop den Uyl, Kok failed to offer a compelling new vision. He also questioned Kok's handling of the 1991 WAO crisis, (Note: In 1991, Kok faced serious criticism, including from within his own party, over the government's plan to drastically reform the Disability Insurance Act (Wet op de arbeidsongeschiktheidsverzekering; WAO). The goal of the reform was to curb the growing number of people making use of the scheme.) though he praised the prime minister's pragmatism. Despite affirming his good relationship with Kok, Melkert stood by his critique. Nonetheless, public support for him remained limited. A poll in July 2001 showed only 16% of voters viewed him as a suitable successor, while most still preferred Kok.

On 24 August, Jacobus van Doorn, a columnist for Trouw, criticized the assumption that Melkert, simply by leading the largest party in parliament, was the logical next prime minister, calling the situation absurd and precarious. He noted the artificiality of Melkert's rise, crafted by advisors and reliant on scripted speeches, and argued that Melkert lacked both popular appeal and the political stature Kok accumulated over years. Despite a well-received speech at the spring congress, which swayed party opinion, Van Doorn remained skeptical, pointing out the scripted nature of the speech and the vulnerability of Melkert's image. He highlighted controversies from Melkert's past ministerial work, including issues with EU funds and the underwhelming results of the Melkertbanen (Melkert jobs). The article concluded by questioning whether a well-rehearsed speech alone qualifies one to lead a country.

On 29 August 2001, two days after the King's Commission released its report on the European Social Fund, clearing Melkert of wrongdoing, (Note: In 1999, it emerged that over 400 million guilders in European Social Fund subsidies, intended for employment projects, had been used since 1994 to cover budget deficits at the Ministry of Social Affairs and Employment, leading to poor project administration and repayment demands from the European Union) Kok announced his resignation, stating he had no further career plans, despite speculation about a potential European role, such as President of the European Commission. In his letter to the party leadership, Kok emphasised his desire to step aside in time for a younger generation to lead. His departure was met with broad respect from political leaders across the spectrum, though parties like the Christian Union and the Reformed Political Party expressed criticism over policies such as euthanasia legislation and same-sex marriage. (Note: For more information on same-sex marriage legalisation during Kok's tenure, see Same-sex marriage in the Netherlands#Legislative action) D66 leader Thom de Graaf hailed Kok as a "statue of integrity and solidity," while former US president Bill Clinton praised him as a pioneer of the Third Way. On 30 August, at a party gathering in Doorn, Melkert officially put himself forward as Kok's successor. On 15 December 2001, at the Labour Party congress, Kok passed the political leadership to Melkert, endorsing him as his rightful heir, while expressing melancholy at the end of his tenure.

=== Developments in junior coalition parties (1998–2001) ===
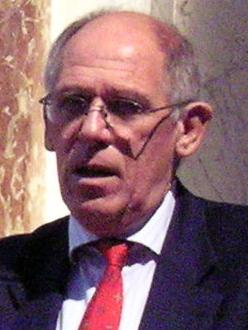
Hans Dijkstal (VVD)

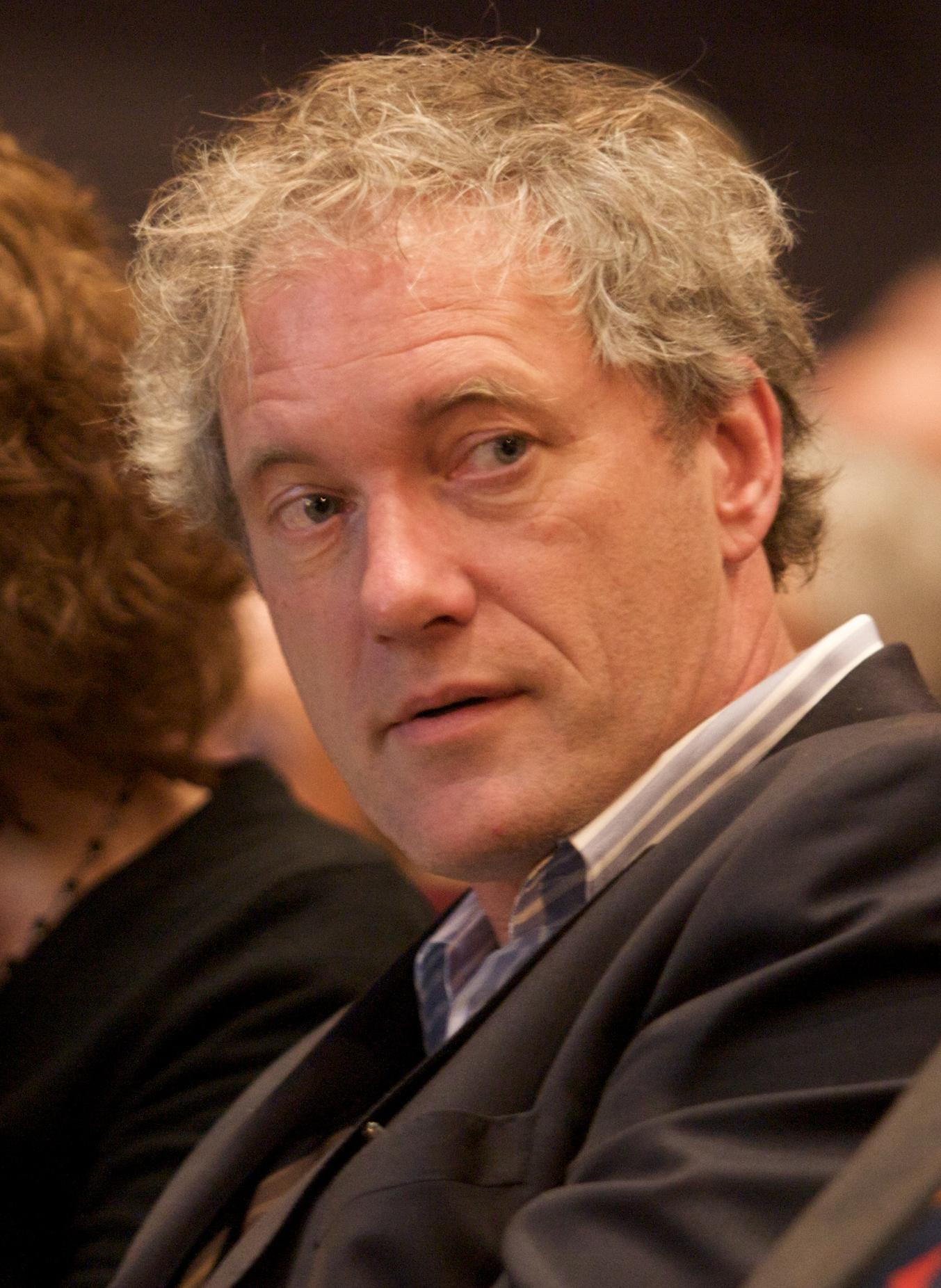
Thom de Graaf (D66)

Lead candidates in 2002 from junior coalition parties
- People's Party for Freedom and Democracy (VVD): In early July 1998, after eight years at the helm of the VVD parliamentary group – longer than any leader except the party's founder, Pieter Oud – Frits Bolkestein decided to step aside. He believed the party would benefit from "new dynamism and a fresh spirit." On 30 July 1998, he formally stepped down as chair of the parliamentary group. At his recommendation, the group elected Hans Dijkstal as his successor, with Clemens Cornielje appointed vice-chair. Although he resigned from the leadership position, Bolkestein did not immediately leave the political stage, choosing to remain active in the House of Representatives until the end of 1999.
- Democrats 66 (D66): On 1 August 1998, D66 held a meeting in Utrecht to discuss the cabinet formation, with general satisfaction about the coalition agreement. Els Borst, the party's lead candidate in 1998, stated that Thom de Graaf would succeed her. Despite holding 14 seats, D66 polled at just 8 by 2001. In November 2000, a Candidate Advisory Committee was formed to vet candidates for the 2002 election. Three people ran for the lead candidate role: De Graaf, Westerouen van Meeteren, and Van Nieuwenhuyzen. On 17 November 2001, De Graaf won decisively. In his speech, he praised D66's role in the purple coalition but acknowledged errors, including forced municipal mergers. He called for a slimmer, more accountable government and criticised Fortuyn for his harsh rhetoric on refugees.

=== Developments in opposition parties (1999–2002) ===
- Christian Democratic Appeal (CDA): On 27 September 2001, party chairman Marnix van Rij resigned due to a fundamental disagreement with parliamentary leader Jaap de Hoop Scheffer over the election campaign strategy. Van Rij viewed De Hoop Scheffer as too passive and ideologically vague. Tensions rose over candidate list rankings and leadership ambitions, with Van Rij eventually declining further candidacy. De Hoop Scheffer accused him of pursuing the party leadership through resignation. Though the party board tried to reconcile them, De Hoop Scheffer withdrew as leader, citing a loss of confidence. He stepped down as parliamentary leader on 1 October. The board rejected Van Rij's leadership proposal and unanimously nominated Jan Peter Balkenende as the new lead candidate, citing his experience and vision. Balkenende was confirmed in November. One of Balkenende's first moves was to announce his party would seek a harsher stance against immigration; post-election analysis has considered this decisive given the hindsight that immigration would become a key issue.
- GroenLinks (GL): On 17 January 2002, GroenLinks announced its candidate list, led by Paul Rosenmöller, who reprised his role as lead candidate. Unexpectedly, the second spot went to Femke Halsema instead of vice-chair Vos. Former co-leaders Mohamed Rabbae and Tom Pitstra were removed; the committee criticised Pitstra's solo conduct, particularly on Afghanistan. (Note: On 18 October 2001, Pitstra dissented from his party's support for the invasion of Afghanistan after the bombardment of Kabul led to civilian casualties.) Rabbae reacted with outrage and threatened to resign. Party members, including Roel van Duijn (formerly a member of The Greens), supported preference campaigns to reinstate them, though Van Duijn was also deemed unsuitable for a seat. MP Van der Steenhoven was placed 13th, likely unelectable; Hermann did not seek re-election. Most MPs received viable positions, though Ab Harrewijn's 11th spot was uncertain. Environmentalist Wijnand Duyvendak was among four newcomers likely to win seats. The list was approved on 9 February with very few changes.
- Christian Union (CU): In 1999, young members of the Reformed Political League (GPV) and Reformatory Political Federation (RPF) founded a platform named Trans-Formatie, criticising their parties' merger talks as too businesslike and lacking inspiration. They called for a Christian, green, progressive, and social direction. Their proposal to omit traditional confessions from the new party's foundation caused controversy. Meanwhile, surveys showed strong support among both parties' members for a joint candidate list and election programme, despite concerns about evangelical inclusion. On 21 October, the parties announced plans to politically unite under a shared program and list, forming a new union while keeping separate financial and membership policies. On 22 January 2000, both parties approved the union, which would be called ChristenUnie, aiming for eventual full integration while allowing gradual organisational cooperation. Former GPV senator Kars Veling would be the lijsttrekker in 2002.
- Socialist Party (SP): In December 1999, the party council focused on implementing decisions from that year's congresses: one on party organisation, the other on the new manifesto. In June 2000, it called for an evaluation, resulting in the report Van wens naar werkelijkheid ("From Wish to Reality"), discussed in local branches and regional conferences. Members criticised a proposal to offer discounts on books and videos to boost engagement, prompting the party board to withdraw it. On 16 December 2000, the council approved improvement measures, including abolishing underperforming districts and replacing them with six regions. On 23 June 2001, the party council unanimously nominated Jan Marijnissen to reprise his role as lead candidate in 2002. No candidates ran against him.
- Reformed Political Party (SGP): In 2001, the SGP continued its fierce opposition to the second Kok cabinet, particularly over the euthanasia law. Internally, the party debated whether to adopt a tougher stance; some warned against being too confrontational. The longstanding issue of women's membership resurfaced when R. Grabijn filed a complaint with the Equal Treatment Commission, which ruled it lacked authority. Internationally, the UN urged the Dutch government to end the SGP's exclusion of women. A majority of Dutch citizens opposed the party's stance. Locally, SGP councillors refused to support female candidates. Senator Holdijk later stated he had no objection to women serving as aldermen, calling the issue overblown. Bas van der Vlies would reprise his role as lead candidate.

== Rise of Pim Fortuyn ==
=== Fortuyn enters the race (August–November 2001) ===
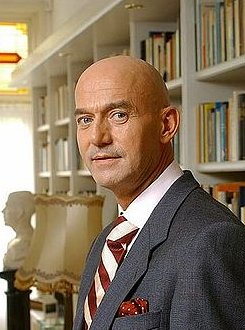
Pim Fortuyn announced his candidacy on 20 August 2001

Anti-Muslim author Pim Fortuyn announced his intention to run for parliament in a television interview with EenVandaag on 20 August 2001, although he did not specify which party he would seek to stand as a candidate with. Although he was already in contact with the newly formed Livable Netherlands (LN) party, he also considered running for the Christian Democratic Appeal which he had worked as a consultant for, or even creating his own list.

Two months later, on 23 October, Livable Netherlands' party leadership formally endorsed Fortuyn as their lead candidate for the upcoming election. The announcement was made by party chairman Jan Nagel. The board's decision, however, was far from universally welcomed. Criticism was aimed both at the selection process and at Fortuyn's controversial political positions. The party leadership acknowledged that Fortuyn did not fit the mould of a conventional candidate, describing him as a non-conformist, but insisted he would respect the party's policy platform. They also made it clear that Fortuyn would be required to moderate his language, particularly his claim that the Netherlands was "full," a remark he had used to support his anti-immigration stance. The tension escalated following the September 11 attacks in the United States, when Fortuyn declared that a "cold war" with Islam was unavoidable – remarks that led three migrant organisations to file formal complaints, accusing him of inciting discrimination against Muslims.

By the summer of 2001, Livable Netherlands was polling at a modest three seats. However, after the party's board officially selected Fortuyn as its lead candidate, public support surged. In the weeks leading up to the party congress, opinion polls showed Livable Netherlands climbing to ten projected seats. Membership numbers reflected this momentum as well, rising from 800 to 1,300 during the same period. At the congress on 25 November, Fortuyn was formally confirmed as the party's frontrunner, winning 394 out of 445 valid votes. Accepting the role with the words, "Ik heb er zin in; at your service", (Note: "Ik heb er zin in" roughly translates to "I'm ready". English vernacular ("at your service") is common in the country; see English in the Netherlands.) he delivered a speech calling for greater openness and clarity in politics.

=== Anti-Fortuyn revolt and counterrevolt in Rotterdam (October 2001 – January 2002) ===
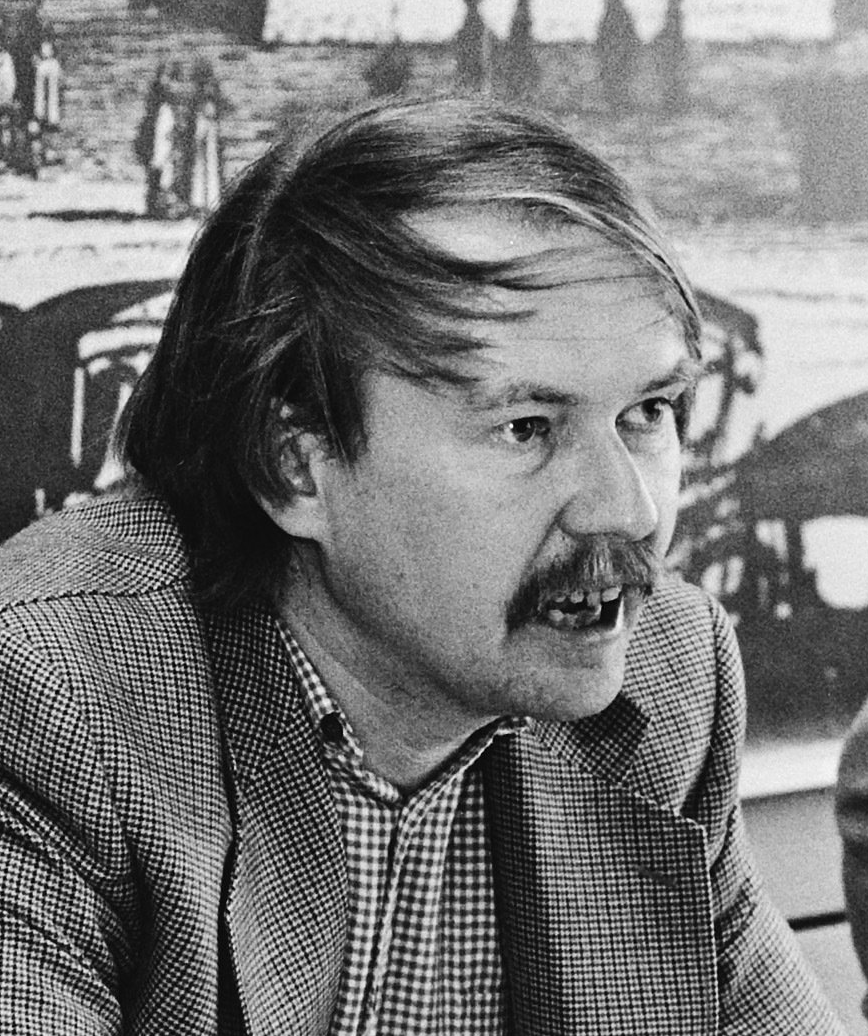
Manuel Kneepkens rejected Fortuyn's nomination and split off the LN's Rotterdam branch

The nomination of Pim Fortuyn as lead candidate of Livable Netherlands on 23 October 2001 provoked internal dissent, most notably from Manuel Kneepkens, leader of the party's Rotterdam branch. Disapproving of both Fortuyn's political positions and the process by which he had been nominated, Kneepkens resigned from the national party in protest. This departure triggered a formal break between the Rotterdam branch and the national organisation. Consequently, the local branch, Stadspartij Leefbaar Rotterdam, abandoned the "Leefbaar" name and was rechristened Stadspartij Rotterdam. On 16 December 2001, this rebellion culminated in the founding of a new national party, Duurzaam Nederland.

In the wake of this schism, a counter-movement emerged among those local members who remained loyal to Fortuyn. On 20 January 2002, Leefbaar Rotterdam was established. During the founding assembly, the newly formed leadership announced that Fortuyn would serve as the party's lead candidate for the forthcoming municipal elections scheduled for 6 March 2002. In accepting the role, Fortuyn addressed the practical implications of holding dual mandates. He stated his belief that he would be capable of fulfilling responsibilities both as a Member of Parliament and as a municipal councillor. According to his own estimate, his parliamentary duties would occupy three to four days per week, while the local council role would require only one day. He emphasised, however, that he had no intention of pursuing a position as alderman.

=== Polls in flux (August 2001 – February 2002) ===
In August 2001, the electoral outlook in the Netherlands appeared stable. The Labour Party remained largely unscathed even amid controversy surrounding European funds. At that time, it was projected to lose only two seats while still retaining its position as the largest party in parliament. The VVD was expected to gain a modest one seat, while the main opposition party, the Christian Democratic Appeal (CDA), stood at 28 seats – reflecting a minor loss of one seat. The CDA continued to struggle in adapting to its role in opposition, still reeling from the severe electoral defeat it had suffered in 1994, when for the first time it was excluded from government. The party remained mired in crisis, seemingly unable to redefine its place in the new political order.

As 2002 approached, the political landscape in the Netherlands began to shift in ways that were not immediately recognised as significant. As early as December 2001, opinion polls began to show a gradual decline in support: first for the Liberal Party (VVD), and then for the Labour Party (PvdA). These early signs, however, were largely downplayed at the time. Labour, in particular, may have suffered from internal tensions within its parliamentary group, contributing to the erosion of its public support.

By January 2002, Fortuyn's LN was emerging as a serious force. Polls projected LN to win 16 seats, a figure that rose to 20 by February. A 2009 study concluded that the most decisive factor for Fortuyn's success was his ability to command media attention, staying in the news every single week in 2002 up to his assassination. Even negative media attention inadvertently aided Fortuyn by airing his views.

Meanwhile, the VVD showed strength at the start of 2002, polling as high as 36 seats, bringing the Catshuis within reach. However, this momentum quickly faded as the party lost ground first to LN and then to the LPF.

== Campaign ==
The campaign began on 28 January 2002, with a debate in The Hague over sports policy. Leaders from CDA, D66, GroenLinks, PvdA and SP were present; the VVD was notably absent. Another debate took place on 13 February, where Melkert suggested abolishing welfare for those who could but did not work; as opposed to the status quo of halving it.

=== Achterlijke (9 February 2002) ===
On 9 February 2002, Fortuyn gave an interview to Volkskrant, a Dutch newspaper, regarding his beliefs on immigration and Islam. He said that the Netherlands, with a population of 16 million, had enough inhabitants, and the practice of allowing as many as 40,000 asylum seekers into the country each year had to be stopped. The actual number for 2001 was 27,000, down slightly on the previous year. He claimed that if he became part of the next government, he would pursue a restrictive immigration policy while also granting citizenship to a large group of illegal immigrants.

He said that he did not intend to "unload our Moroccan hooligans" onto the Moroccan King Hassan. Hassan had died three years earlier. He considered Article 7 of the constitution, which asserts freedom of speech, of greater importance than Article 1, which forbids discrimination on the basis of religion, life principles, political inclination, race, or sexual preference. Fortuyn distanced himself from Hans Janmaat of the Centre Democrats, who in the 1980s wanted to remove all foreigners from the country and was repeatedly convicted for discrimination and hate speech.

Fortuyn proposed that all people who already resided in the Netherlands would be allowed to stay, provided the immigrants adopted Dutch society's consensus on human rights as their own. He stated: "not integrating means leaving" and "the borders have to be hermetically closed". He said "If it were legally possible, I'd say no more Muslims will get in here", claiming that the influx of Muslims would threaten freedoms in the Netherlands' liberal society. He thought Muslim culture had never undergone a process of modernisation and therefore still lacked acceptance of democracy and women's, gays', lesbians' and minorities' rights.

When asked by the Volkskrant whether he hated Islam, he replied:

I don't hate Islam. I consider it a backward (achterlijke) culture. I have travelled much in the world. And wherever Islam rules, it's just terrible. All the hypocrisy. It's a bit like those old Reformed Protestants. The Reformed lie all the time. And why is that? Because they have standards and values that are so high that you can't humanly maintain them. You also see that in that Muslim culture. Then look at the Netherlands. In what country could an electoral leader of such a large movement as mine be openly homosexual? How wonderful that that's possible. That's something that one can be proud of. And I'd like to keep it that way, thank you very much. (Note: Original quote in Dutch: "Ik haat de islam niet. Ik vind het een achterlijke cultuur. Ik heb veel gereisd in de wereld. En overal waar de islam de baas is, is het gewoon verschrikkelijk. Al die dubbelzinnigheid. Het heeft wel iets weg van die oude gereformeerden. Gereformeerden liegen altijd. En hoe komt dat? Omdat ze een normen- en waardenstelsel hebben dat zo hoog ligt dat je dat menselijkerwijs niet kunt handhaven. Dat zie je in die moslimcultuur ook. Kijk dan naar Nederland. In welk land zou een lijsttrekker van een zo grote beweging als de mijne, openlijk homoseksueel kunnen zijn? Wat fantastisch dat dat kan. Daar mag je trots op zijn. En dat wil ik graag effe zo houden".)

Fortuyn used the word achterlijke, literally meaning "backward", but commonly used as an insult in the sense of "retarded". After his use of "achterlijk" caused an uproar, Fortuyn said he had used the word with its literal meaning of "backward".

Against the advice of his campaign team, Fortuyn said in the interview that he favoured closing borders to Muslim immigrants and if possible he would abolish the "peculiar article" of the Dutch constitution forbidding discrimination (at the time it was generally assumed that he referred to Article 1, the equality before the law; it has been argued, however, that Fortuyn and the interviewer had confused this with Article 137 of the Penal Code, incitement to hatred).

=== Foundation of the Pim Fortuyn List (9–15 February 2002) ===
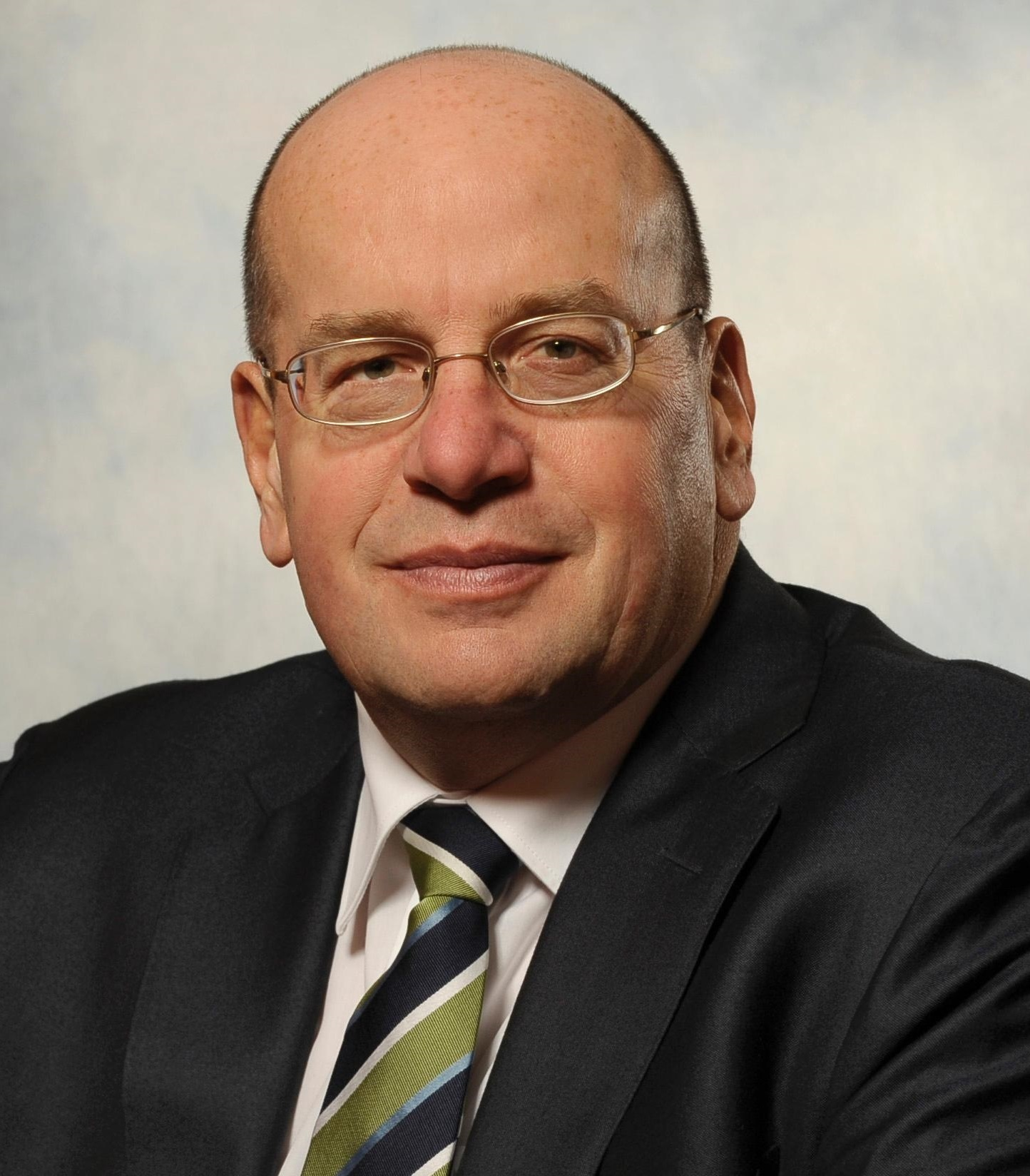
Following controversial comments, Livable Netherlands sacked Fortuyn and named Fred Teeven (pictured) as his replacement.

Fortuyn's controversial interview with de Volkskrant caused an immediate political storm. Leaders from across the political spectrum condemned his remarks, particularly his perceived challenge to Article 1 of the constitution, which prohibits discrimination. Dijkstal called it the "heart of our civilisation," while Melkert accused Fortuyn of crossing an unforgivable line. In the evening of 9 February, Livable Netherlands' leadership held an emergency meeting and, after Fortuyn insisted on the accuracy of the published interview, voted six to two to sever ties with him. The board believed he had gone too far in his views on asylum policy. Chairman Nagel reaffirmed the party's commitment to Article 1, stressing the Netherlands was not full. The next day, Fortuyn expressed hope of reconciling but also said he would run independently if needed. Nagel quickly dismissed this possibility, citing irreconcilable differences. In contrast, Livable Rotterdam re-affirmed its support for Fortuyn on 11 February, prompting two of its candidates (including Livable Netherlands co-founder Broos Schnetz) to resign.

On 12 February, Livable Netherlands opened the search for a new frontrunner. Though several prominent figures (including Schnetz) declined to stand, seven others volunteered, and the party board eventually nominated former public prosecutor Fred Teeven on 10 March. Meanwhile, Fortuyn, though initially discouraged, was persuaded by close allies to start his own party. On 14 February, they founded the Pim Fortuyn List, officially registering it the following day. Fortuyn became the party's chairman, supported by a small leadership team, and coordinators were appointed across all electoral districts to gather the necessary signatures for participation. To the surprise of many political observers, polling showed that Fortuyn carried most of the support from Livable Netherlands with him. This contradicted the prevailing belief that Dutch voters prioritised parties over individual candidates.

The split weakened Livable Netherlands significantly. Though many regional coordinators supported the leadership's decision, a number of members expressed sympathy for Fortuyn. Polling numbers plummeted from a projected 22 seats before Fortuyn's removal to just six a month later. Financial troubles soon followed. Real estate agent Harry Mens and two other donors, who had collectively given over €200,000 to Fortuyn's campaign, sought to reclaim their contributions. They placed legal claims on the party's accounts, arguing the money was intended for Fortuyn personally. Party chairman Nagel countered that the donations were not specifically earmarked, and returning them was impossible due to prior commitments. A bank guarantee from the party's fundraising foundation helped settle most disputes, though Mens continued to demand repayment before ultimately reaching a separate agreement.

=== Municipal elections (6 March 2002) ===
2002 Rotterdam municipal election
| Party | Votes | % | Seats | +/– |
|---|---|---|---|---|
| Livable Rotterdam | 86,027 | 34.66% | 17 | New |
| Labour Party | 55,648 | 22.42% | 11 | ▼4 |
| Christian Democratic Appeal | 28,047 | 11.30% | 5 | ▼1 |
| People's Party for Freedom and Democracy | 24,417 | 9.84% | 4 | ▼5 |
| GroenLinks | 16,081 | 6.48% | 3 | ▼1 |
| Democrats 66 | 12,698 | 5.12% | 2 | ▼1 |
| Socialist Party | 9,815 | 3.95% | 1 | ▼3 |
| CU–SGP (Note: Stood as SGP/GPV/RPF in the prior election. GPV and RPF had since merged into Christian Union (CU)) | 6,834 | 2.75% | 1 | Steady |
| Stadspartij Rotterdam | 6,098 | 2.46% | 1 | ▼1 |
| Islamic Party Netherlands | 825 | 0.33% | 0 | Steady |
| Joop2000 | 864 | 0.35% | 0 | Steady |
| New National Party | 598 | 0.24% | 0 | Steady |
| Dutch People's Union | 265 | 0.11% | 0 | Steady |
| Union 55+ (did not participate) | n/a | n/a | 0 | ▼1 |
| Total valid votes | 248,217 | | 45 | – |
| Invalid/blank votes | 1,106 | | | |
| Eligible votes/turnout | 453,140 | 55.0% | | |

On 16 February, Melkert officially launched the party's municipal election campaign with an address at the anniversary congress of the Centre for Local Government in Arnhem, emphasising public safety and crime prevention as central themes. Near the end of February, Fortuyn announced he would no longer campaign for Livable Rotterdam after a hostile incident during the filming of a television advertisement at a metro station, where he was subjected to verbal abuse and threats from a group of immigrant youths who accused him of racism and fascism.

Heading the list of the Livable Rotterdam party, considered to be the local counterpart of the LPF, Fortuyn achieved a major victory in the Rotterdam municipal council election on 6 March 2002. The new party won 17 seats, making it the largest party in the council. German and Belgian newspapers referred to it as a "Black Wednesday" and compared the outcome to the electoral victory of the far-right Vlaams Blok in Antwerp. Fortuyn received unwanted congratulations from Filip Dewinter, leader of the Vlaams Blok.

Forming a new city government in Rotterdam was initially challenging. With the help of Professor Rinus van Schendelen, who acted as a political mediator, a coalition was eventually forged between Livable Rotterdam, CDA, and the VVD. This marked a historic shift, as the Labour Party, was left out of the municipal administration for the first time since World War II. Livable Rotterdam appointed three aldermen, including De Faria, while both coalition partners, CDA and VVD, each filled two alderman positions. The new city executive officially took office by the end of April.

The Labour Party faced a disappointing outcome in the municipal elections, especially in Rotterdam. While the party saw modest gains in Amsterdam and held ground in The Hague, its performance varied depending on how well local officials engaged with citizens. A review in November criticised the party's focus on grand construction projects over everyday concerns. Still, the PvdA remained influential in many city governments, retaining aldermen positions across numerous municipalities.

Fortuyn's victory made him the subject of hundreds of interviews during the next three months, and he made many statements about his political ideology. In March he released his book The Mess of Eight Purple Years (Dutch: De puinhopen van acht jaar Paars), which criticised the current political system in the Netherlands and was used as his political agenda for the upcoming general election. Purple is the colour to indicate a coalition government consisting of left parties (red) and conservative-liberal parties (blue). The Netherlands had been governed by such a coalition for eight years at that time.

=== NOS debate and fallout (6–19 March 2002) ===
External videos
- 6 March 2002 debate on NOS (in Dutch)

During the night of 6 to 7 March, the Dutch broadcaster NOS hosted a live televised debate featuring the top candidates from the CDA, D66, GroenLinks, PvdA, VVD, and LPF, all responding to the outcomes of the municipal elections. Pim Fortuyn, having achieved a resounding electoral victory in Rotterdam, entered the debate as the clear frontrunner and subsequently dominated the discussion: Melkert and Dijkstal looked exhausted and overwhelmed, offering little resistance. Thom de Graaf barely made an impact, while Rosenmöller stood out as the only participant to challenge Fortuyn with any real force. Balkenende adopted a cautious and reflective tone throughout. The next day, media coverage focused heavily on the poor impression left by Melkert and Dijkstal.

In the debate, Melkert came across as grumpy, tired, and arrogant. Political commentators and journalists were nearly unanimous in their negative assessments. Even Melkert himself conceded afterwards that things had not gone well. The Labour Party chairman, Ruud Koole, was less diplomatic, calling the debate "terrible". His blunt remarks sparked backlash within the party, prompting him to walk them back a few days later at a political forum in Utrecht, claiming his words had been misrepresented in the press.

By 13 March, polling showed a dramatic shift in voter sentiment, with the Labour Party and VVD both suffering significant losses compared to prior polling in late February. Labour dropped from 34 to a projected 31 seats, and the VVD fell from 33 to 25, declines largely attributed to the poor debate performance of their leaders. In contrast, support for LPF surged from 20 to 27 seats, while the CDA also rose from 25 to 29. LN and D66 both grew from 6 to 7 seats.

After the NOS debate, Melkert pledged to take the criticism seriously. Speaking to his PvdA candidates on 19 March in Scheveningen, he promised a shift in tone. The LPF, he said, would be treated as a legitimate political force rather than dismissed, and the PvdA would work to present itself with more clarity and authority. As an immediate gesture, Melkert withdrew party support for a controversial proposal to privatise Schiphol Airport. Still, Melkert remained vague on future coalition preferences, even after Dijkstal publicly cast doubt on any potential VVD–PvdA cooperation during his own party's congress in April.

=== Later debates; "Footnotes, professor!" (21 March – 1 May 2002) ===
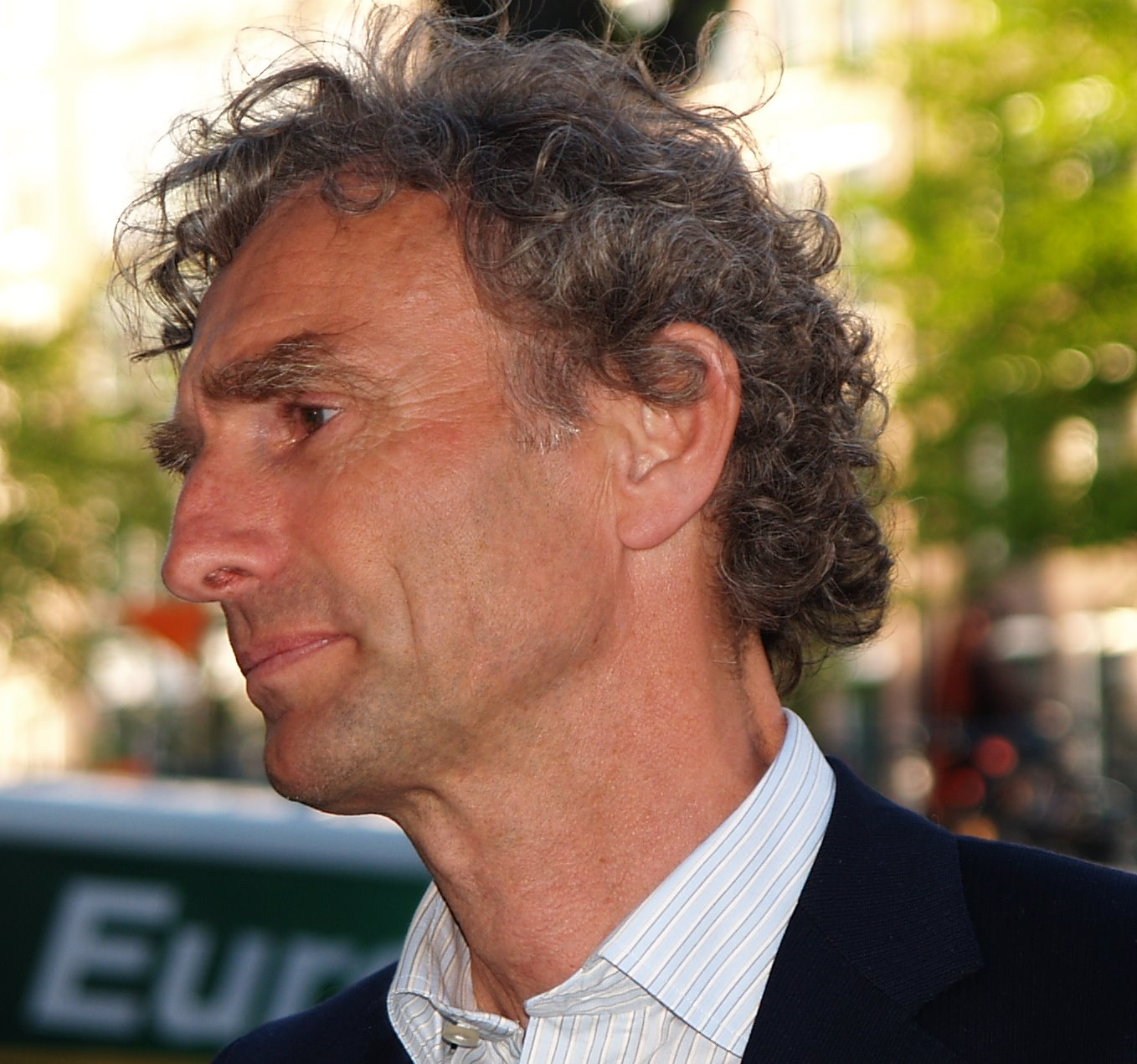
Paul Rosenmöller was considered the winner of the 21 March debate

In the Rotterdam lead candidates' debate at Erasmus University on 21 March, Dijkstal again projected a lacklustre image, yet his party elders publicly reaffirmed their confidence at his repeated request. Rosenmöller assailed Fortuyn, accusing him of theatrically evading substantive criticism; Fortuyn fell silent and threatened to leave. Melkert rebuked Fortuyn, Balkenende rejected soft drug tolerance, and Dijkstal remained reserved. The confrontation reshaped voter sentiment. A NIPO poll released 28 March crowned Rosenmöller debate victor, raising GroenLinks ten seats to fourteen, while Fortuyn's LPF fell to 26, the CDA edged up to thirty, equalling the PvdA's diminished total, and the VVD slipped to 24. D66 held six seats while Livable Netherlands dropped to four. These swings were attributed to public reaction against Melkert and Dijkstal's earlier faltering performances and to Fortuyn's perceived defeat.

Fortuyn's bruising experience made him reluctant to join further multi-party debates; he skipped the television programme Buitenhof on 7 April, allowing Marijnissen to criticise eight years of purple coalition rule as "a flagrant shambles." Nevertheless, on 12 April Fortuyn sparred with Melkert on Netwerk, where the Labour leader mocked his unnuanced platform: "Footnotes, professor!" (Note: Dutch: "Voetnoten, professor!".) and both swore never to govern together. A warmer exchange followed the next day between Balkenende and Fortuyn on Knevel op zaterdag, reflecting the CDA's tactical decision not to alienate LPF voters while continuing to criticise the incumbent coalition. Inside the CDA, figures such as former chairman Marnix van Rij urged an explicit tilt toward Labour, yet Balkenende refused to rule out any alliance, insisting even combinations with GroenLinks or LPF remained conceivable. That stance drew irritation from Melkert, who likened Fortuyn to France's Jean-Marie Le Pen and accused the CDA leader of dangerous flirtation with right-wing populism.

On 24 April, Melkert courted the CDA in a debate with Balkenende, disavowing the VVD and warning that Fortuyn would only serve already well-off citizens. Five days later, alongside Social Affairs Minister Willem Vermeend and Speaker Jeltje van Nieuwenhoven, Melkert unveiled a "Contract with the Netherlands," a ten-point blueprint demanding Ministers set measurable objectives and resign if they failed within their first hundred days. Yet media criticism persisted: party chairman Ruud Koole lamented Melkert's limited telegenic appeal and argued the Labour Party focus on security was excessively punitive. At the 1 May rally in Maastricht, Melkert dismissed obsession with his image—"I'm sick of the whining"—and renewed attacks on Fortuyn for caricaturing reality and consigning women to kitchens, while outgoing Kok urged loyalists to rally behind the embattled Labour leader.

=== Candidate lists and coalition proposals (14 February – 12 April 2002) ===
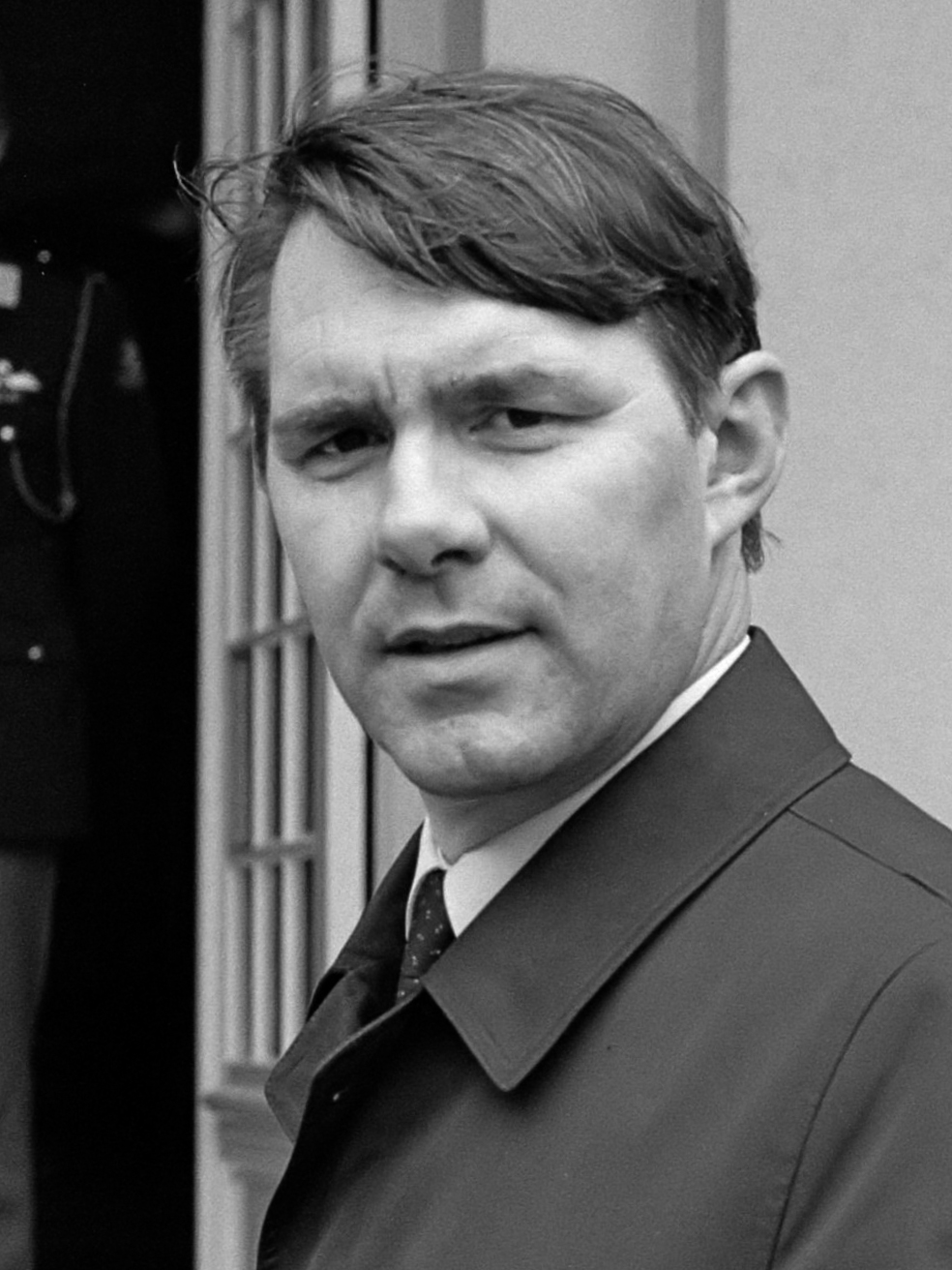
Bas van der Vlies (SGP) rejected a joint campaign with CU on 16 February

After the unexpected break with Livable Netherlands on 14 February, Fortuyn had little time to recruit candidates, as the final candidate list had to be submitted by 2 April. Initially, he had stated he did not want candidates from his former party, calling them "opportunists." On 21 March, Fortuyn presented his list, with João Varela, a Cape Verdean-born business economist, in second place, and former CDA MEP Jim Janssen van Raaij in third. The only woman in the top fifteen was agricultural expert Winny de Jong. Notably, eight of the first 32 candidates were from Livable Netherlands, despite Fortuyn's earlier statements. Most candidates lacked political experience. Soon, several candidates became embroiled in scandals, including M. Kievits, accused of assault and harassment, leading to his removal from the list. Others, like Cor Eberhard and Theo de Graaf were accused of offering financial contributions in exchange for candidacies, triggering investigations that later ended without prosecutions.

Meanwhile, internal conflicts emerged within the LPF. Eberhard and number sixteen, Hans Smolders, were barred from party headquarters following complaints from two female candidates, who alleged sexist behaviour and retaliation when they rejected advances. Fortuyn dismissed the matter as a common office squabble. In parallel, the Christian Union experienced tensions with its traditional partner SGP. On 16 February, Veling proposed a joint campaign, but Van der Vlies declined, citing growing differences. At CU's 23 March election congress, Veling launched the campaign advocating increased development aid, the introduction of a child budget, and opposition to abortion and euthanasia laws. He also firmly rejected any coalition with the LPF, arguing Fortuyn's vision left no room for Christian compassion or protection of the vulnerable, urging other Christian parties to follow his example—an appeal not heeded by the CDA or SGP. Labour likewise precluded the possibility of a coalition with LPF. During a press conference on 13 March, Fortuyn expressed his belief that, based on public statements regarding coalitions, he would probably end up in a coalition with VVD and CDA.

As the election approached, the SGP under Van der Vlies began its campaign on 12 April in Amersfoort. Van der Vlies harshly criticised the outgoing purple coalition, calling it "extreme". He reminded supporters that during the previous legislative term, the SGP had opposed laws permitting euthanasia, same-sex marriage, and abortion. Unlike Veling, Van der Vlies insisted that repeal of these laws would be a non-negotiable condition for any future coalition participation. He warned SGP voters considering a tactical switch to the CDA that doing so would make them complicit in compromises that CDA leader Balkenende had already indicated he might entertain.

=== Srebrenica report and cabinet resignation (10–16 April 2002) ===
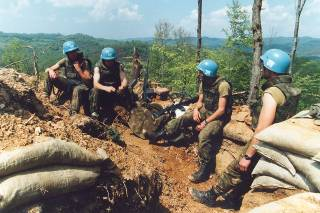
A NIOD report censured the mismanagement of Dutchbat (pictured) during the Srebrenica massacre, prompting the cabinet to resign.

On 10 April, the Netherlands Institute for War Documentation (NIOD) published a report titled Srebrenica: a 'safe' area. The report identified the enclave's capture and subsequent massacre as the most violent episode of the Fall of Yugoslavia, attributing principal responsibility to Bosnian-Serb commanders and Belgrade while noting grave offences by all parties. Investigators found that General Philippe Morillon's 1993 promise of UN protection fostered a misleading aura of security, because the "safe area" lacked mandate, firepower, supplies and intelligence. The Netherlands, driven by humanitarian idealism and prestige, volunteered Dutchbat without appreciating the mission's hazards or preparing its troops culturally and logistically. When Serb forces advanced on 11 July 1995, Dutchbat's pleas for robust air support were rejected, leaving it powerless. Thousands of Muslim men were then separated, transported and executed on orders from the VRS General Staff under Ratko Mladić. The report censured Dutch political and military leaders for underestimating risks and resisting intelligence improvements.

After the report's release, internal cabinet pressure mounted. Housing, Spatial Planning and Environment Minister Jan Pronk, a Labour stalwart who had highlighted genocide during a 1995 visit to Bosnia, declared on 15 April that he would resign alone if necessary, threatening the coalition's stability. Defence Minister Frank de Grave of the VVD similarly contemplated departure when he learned the army hierarchy had misled him; though in office only since 1998, he had ordered an inquiry led by Jos van Kemenade whose findings NIOD deemed incomplete. Faced with these fissures, Kok concluded that collective responsibility demanded a stronger gesture. On 16 April, one month before the general election, he tendered his cabinet's resignation, explaining his wish to "visibly to accept responsibility toward the victims and relatives of Srebrenica."

On 17 April, the House of Representatives established a parliamentary inquiry chaired by D66 member Bert Bakker; hearings began in June, charged with assigning political, military and diplomatic accountability for the enclave's fall. Survivors reacted bleakly: Sabaheta Fejzic, who had lost her son, insisted that "They should have resigned ages ago [...] They will never wash the guilt off their faces", while Hasan Nuhanović, who served as a UN interpreter, demanded justice rather than symbolic sacrifice. Commentators observed that standing down enabled Labour and the VVD to distance themselves from a now-criticised coalition and to demonstrate political accountability, yet opinion polls registered almost no shift. The ministers remained in office as a caretaker government until after the elections and the formation of the next government, and the date of the election was not changed.

=== Security incidents and concerns (23 October 2001 – 14 May 2002) ===
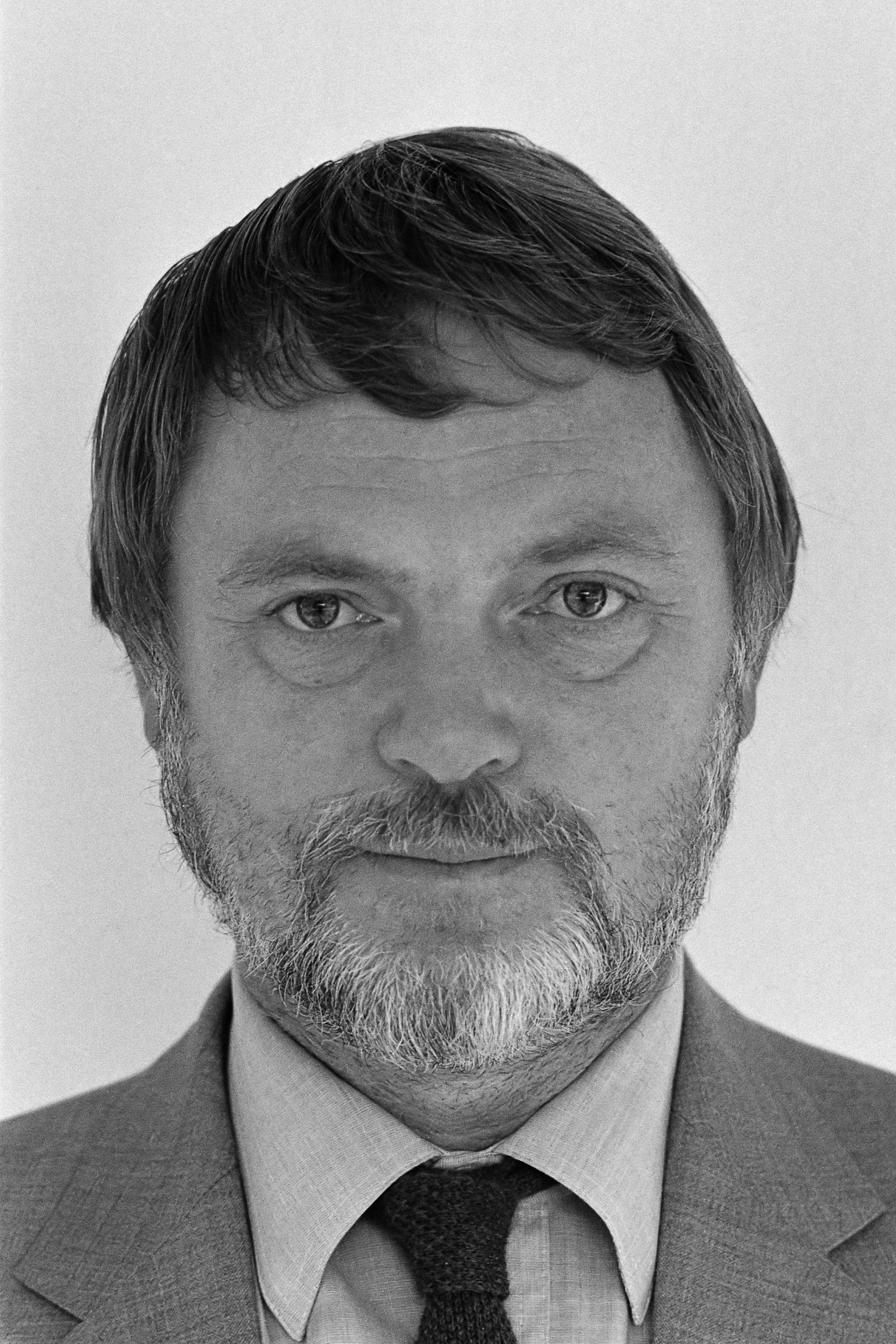
Livable Netherlands chairman Jan Nagel forwarded anti-Fortuyn death threats to authorities in October 2001, but the messages did not meets thresholds of seriousness and were ignored.

The announcement of Fortuyn's selection as Livable Netherlands' lead candidate on 23 October 2001 unleashed a stream of threats that the party forwarded to Hilversum police. Messages spoke of decapitation, warned of war if the "neo-fascist" advanced, and hinted that "someone might do something." Chairman Jan Nagel delivered the e-mails on 31 October, yet the regional threat assessment team dismissed them as juvenile provocation, the sort of "silly stuff" any private recipient would erase. Their decision aligned with standing Dutch guidelines, which required specific, imminent peril before extra protection was triggered, but it revealed a gulf between Fortuyn's perception of danger and official thresholds. Nagel observed mounting public agitation after the nomination, but because the threats contained no operational details the police registered the case and took no further action.

In the weeks that followed, Fortuyn publicly criticised the authorities for indifference, telling Panorama on 7 November that the police "guarantee nothing" and that he lived under threat for opposing Islam. During a post-election inquiry, Rotterdam's police stated that no acute risk had ever been reported and that Fortuyn himself had never requested assistance. A private security consultancy nevertheless prepared a December plan that highlighted three vulnerabilities: hostility from radicalised immigrants, resentment stirred by his nightlife habits, and general celebrity exposure. Even so, Fortuyn rebuffed most recommended measures. He rejected alarms and reinforced doors because he would not be "locked in" and spurned close-quarter bodyguards as undignified. Livable Netherlands therefore pared its arrangements to occasional event marshals and a follow-car funded from party coffers.

On 14 March, activists styling themselves the Biological Baker's Brigade (Biologische Bakkers Brigade) ambushed Fortuyn outside a Hilversum studio, coating him with rancid cream pies while chanting "No votes for racism." The episode left Fortuyn shaken and smeared in putrid liquid yet physically unhurt. Commentators were divided: some labelled the incident comic theatre, others called it terrorism, and a few cynically suggested it might help his polling numbers. Kok swiftly condemned any intimidation of candidates, but Fortuyn blamed the governing parties for cultivating hatred. Pressed by lawyer Gerard Hammerstein, Fortuyn eventually lodged a complaint, arguing that prosecutors must act "before pies become stones." Police arrested the three perpetrators two months later on 14 May. Furthermore, street youths in Rotterdam hurled a beer can and slurs at Fortuyn, and a painter in Goes defaced a portrait of Fortuyn with a swastika.

When Barend & Van Dorp aired on 5 April, Fortuyn stated that he no longer felt safe in Rotterdam's streets, though he reiterated he would not beg for state escorts. The broadcast prompted police superintendent Ron de Jong to visit his Bergselaan residence on 15 April for a precautionary discussion. Observers noted a cordial meeting: Fortuyn produced no fresh threats, expressed minimal anxiety, and even joined halfway through by coincidence rather than appointment. De Jong left a business card, concluding no imminent peril existed, while Fortuyn's confidant Hans de Booij likewise judged the climate manageable. Fortuyn's own ambivalence hindered any escalation of protective protocols; he valued mobility, secrecy about his schedule, and unfiltered contact with supporters. Consequently, officials maintained routine observation, and the Bureau Security Coordination remained sidelined, awaiting clearer signals that the threshold for intervention had been crossed.

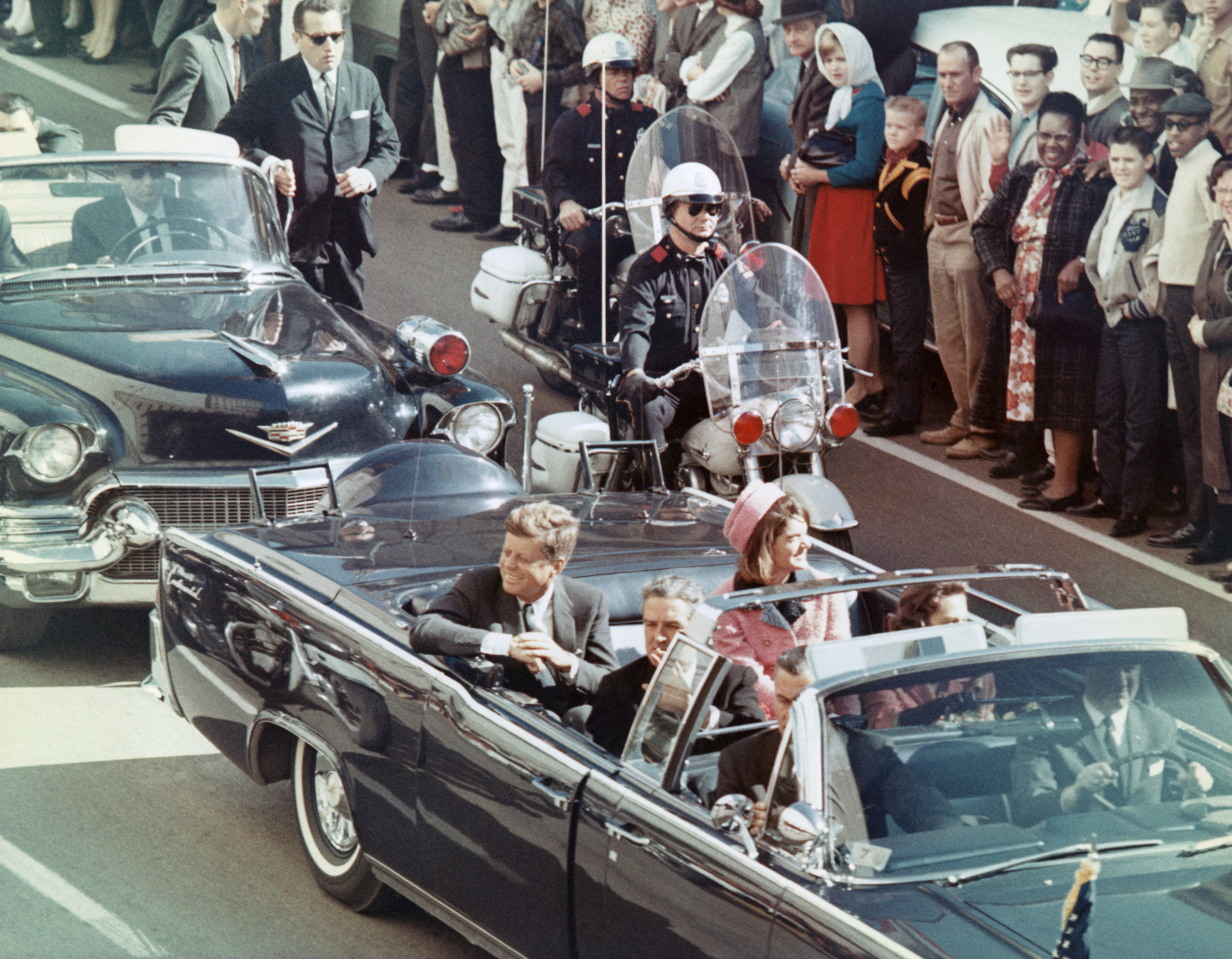
At one point, Fortuyn talked with Harry Mens about the assassination of John F. Kennedy and said: "That's a beautiful death. That's how you make history."

Further escalation began with a 29 April e-mail warning that a clique of Moroccan youths planned to exploit the confusion of an 11 May demonstration to assassinate Fortuyn. The message, relayed through intermediaries to Rotterdam police that night, was judged serious enough for referral to domestic intelligence, yet investigators also knew the sender had a record of neighbourhood disputes and anti-Muslim agitation, factors that complicated credibility. Still, the threat rattled Fortuyn. Journalists visiting him on 1 May described a visibly anxious candidate who said he would "not be surprised" if shot soon and claimed taxi drivers offered better protection than the state. Minor disturbances followed: police dispersed loitering youths outside Restaurant Saur on 2 May, and surveillance of his haunts was quietly intensified. On 6 May, hours before the assassination, police again sought to verify the email sender's identity, but events outpaced bureaucracy; by evening Fortuyn lay dead.

In the aftermath of Fortuyn's assassination, several close associates offered reflections on his attitude toward threats and personal security. Harry Mens recounted that Fortuyn had been warned by De Booij on the day of the murder not to return to Rotterdam due to threats of an attack or shooting, but Fortuyn remained characteristically nonchalant, quoting his mother's refrain: "Pim, it comes as it comes, don't worry." When asked about bodyguards, Mens said Fortuyn had repeatedly refused them, believing they offered no real protection: "If they want to get me, they will." At one point, Fortuyn talked with Mens about the assassination of John F. Kennedy and said: "That's a beautiful death. That's how you make history."

=== Final debate (5 May 2002) ===
The final debate was held on 5 May 2002, featuring only Fortuyn and Melkert. It was hosted by Algemeen Dagblad (AD). Fortuyn accused Labour and Kok of turning half of Rotterdam against him and forcing him to deny parallels with Jean-Marie Le Pen in three press briefings. Melkert countered that Fortuyn's rhetoric pandered to a yearning for "the strong man," an image intertwined with Europe's fascist past. Incensed, Fortuyn demanded whether he was being branded a dictator; Melkert replied that, in a nation seared by the Holocaust, invoking strongman leadership inevitably summoned painful associations. Fortuyn called the remark scandalous, insisting he had only praised Silvio Berlusconi and not Adolf Hitler or Benito Mussolini.

Shifting to economics, Melkert lauded eight years of purple coalitions for eradicating 1990s unemployment and deficits, thus safeguarding future pensions. Fortuyn dismissed job creation boasts and argued that government competence should be measured by public services, which he deemed bloated and detached from ordinary citizens. Regarding immigration, Melkert condemned Fortuyn's vow to seal borders as both unenforceable and uncivilised, warning it would undermine post‑war humanitarian achievements and Rotterdam's open economy. He called it "painful" that this had to be discussed on Liberation Day. Fortuyn retorted that asylum spending should fund refugee camps in neighbouring regions and that undocumented entrants must be repatriated immediately.

The debate remained unpublished until the AD released it on 18 June, four weeks after Fortuyn's assassination. Editors told Nova they had delayed release to avoid fuelling tensions during national mourning; by June they deemed it a "historic document." Labour urged suppression, arguing the campaign had died with Fortuyn and fearing renewed polarisation around Melkert, still under permanent police guard. NRC Handelsblad reported the party also worried about his safety, as his home remained under surveillance. The LPF raised no objections, citing Fortuyn's belief in freedom of speech.

=== Assassination of Pim Fortuyn (6 May 2002) ===
Volkert van der Graaf, an environmental and animal rights activist, viewed Fortuyn as a growing threat to the foundations of Dutch society, particularly to vulnerable groups such as asylum seekers, Muslims, and disability benefit recipients. Convinced that Fortuyn's rise endangered democratic norms and social justice, he resolved that the politician had to be stopped and that assassination was the only means. He began preparing for the attack by printing floor plans of the Mediapark and studying Fortuyn's movements, having learned online that Fortuyn would be at the radio studios on 6 May from 16:00 to 18:00. Van der Graaf familiarized himself with the layout of the location and ensured he would not appear out of place. He retrieved the weapon on the evening of 5 May or the morning of 6 May.

On the morning of 6 May, Van der Graaf completed the final steps of a meticulously planned attack on Fortuyn. He loaded a seven‑round magazine, wore latex gloves to avoid fingerprints, and buried his pistol, wrapped in a plastic bag, within shrubbery bordering the Mediapark car park so that, if challenged, he would not be found armed. After leaving his office around 12:30, he bought shaving supplies, halted at a lay‑by on the A12 to remove his conspicuous stubble, and drove on to Hilversum. Near 16:00 he parked close to the studios, entered on foot via a cycle path, and scouted the grounds. Spotting two Jaguars, he assumed Fortuyn would emerge nearby after a scheduled broadcast, concealed himself in undergrowth for nearly an hour, and kept white spirit at hand to wipe objects of prints. Dressed unobtrusively, with earrings removed, cap low and sunglasses on, he waited for Fortuyn.

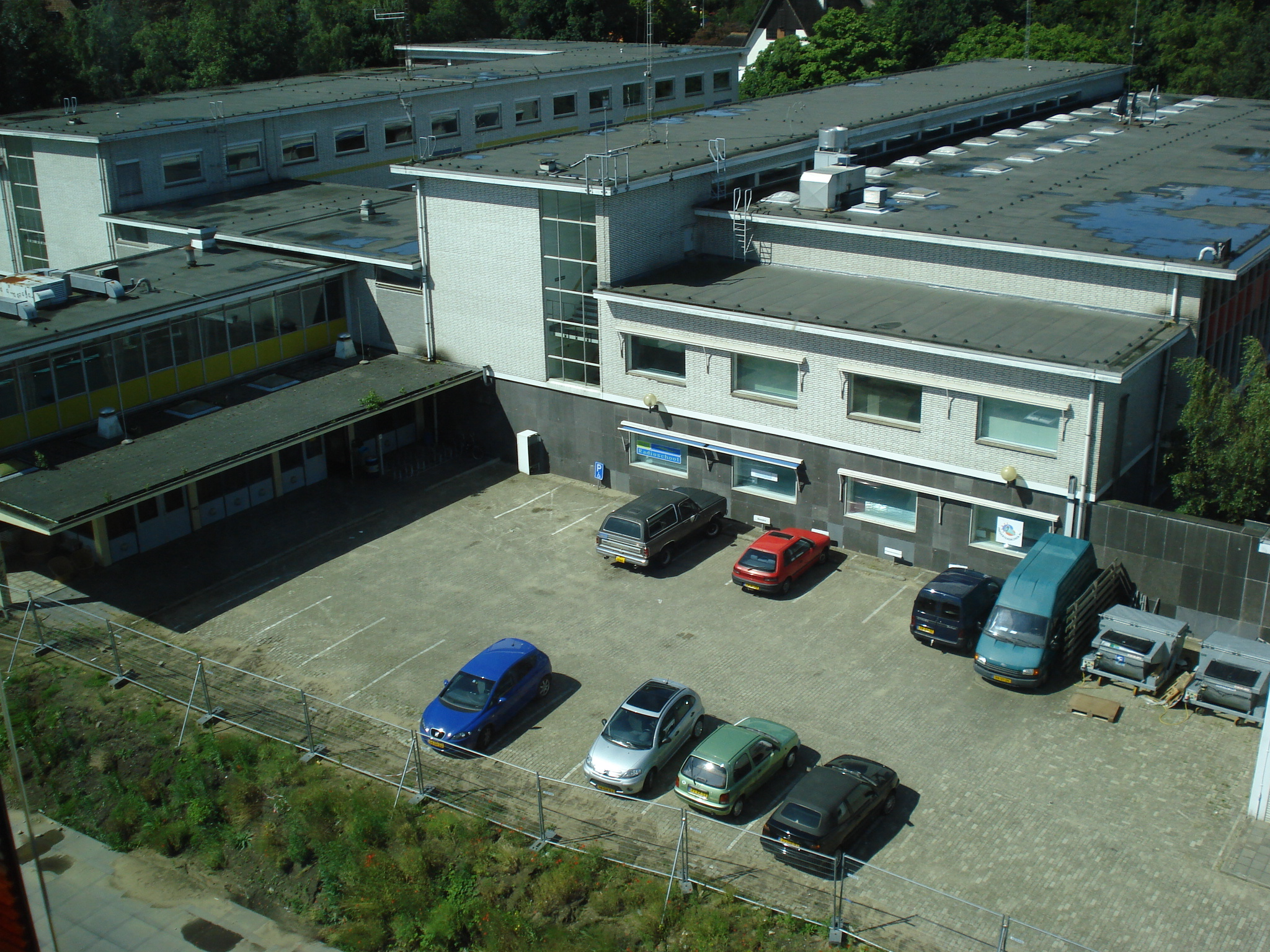
The car park where Fortuyn was assassinated

Shortly before 18:00, when the radio transmission concluded, Van der Graaf retrieved the pistol, moved beside a parked vehicle, and advanced as Fortuyn stepped toward his Daimler. At roughly one and a half metres he raised both arms and fired five shots through a plastic bag into Fortuyn's back, chest and head, selecting a rear approach to ensure lethality and prevent alarm. Forensic reconstruction later identified three perforating wounds to the torso and two tangential cranial injuries; bullets lacerated the carotid artery, larynx, lungs, pericardium and brain. Feeling the recoil each time, Van der Graaf realigned his sights, discharging a sixth round unintentionally into the pavement, then withdrew, feeling certain of Fortuyn's death.

A shout inside the studio announced gunfire; receptionist Shirley Brefeld sprinted to the car park and knelt beside Fortuyn, who lay supine. She noted two head wounds, greying skin, and slipping consciousness, clasped his hand and urged him to fight while his eyes seemed to flicker open once more before life faded. Paramedics eventually arrived and persisted with resuscitation—"keep going for the cameras," one was overheard—and conveyed the mortally wounded leader to hospital. Brefeld, still holding the IV bag, bristled at what seemed a spectacle made of a dying man.

After shooting Fortuyn, Van der Graaf ran away. Hans Smolders, Fortuyn's driver, pursued him. At the Celebeslaan, Van der Graaf pivoted, extended his arm and shot Smolders, who braced for another round and persisted as Van der Graaf veered into the Lage Naarderweg. Maintaining a brisk pace, Van der Graaf reached the Texaco forecourt, where police converged, subdued him and removed the firearm—still loaded with four cartridges—from his right‑hand jacket pocket.

Shock swept the political sphere after the assassination. Kok appealed for calm, while Melkert labelled the killing repellent, Dijkstal felt utterly crushed, and Balkenende expressed deep shock; the leaders of D66, GroenLinks and the SP voiced similar grief. That evening the cabinet met in The Hague to weigh postponing the 15 May election, a measure urged chiefly by the Socialist Party. Kok agreed first to consult the LPF. Receiving the delegation the next morning, he heard their wish to proceed on schedule in honour of Fortuyn's memory. This stance convinced Kok, his deputies and, in turn, the other parties. Furthermore, it was agreed to suspend most campaign activity.

Inside the LPF, sorrow quickly turned to disarray. Gathered in Rotterdam, officials heard spokesman Mat Herben blame the left for fostering hatred since the municipal polls; a call from Kok prompted him to temper his words. Lacking both a list leader and a chair, the candidates on 7 May appointed Peter Langendam interim president and Herben acting political leader, postponing a permanent choice until after the election, keeping Fortuyn on the ballot despite his death. During Fortuyn's burial on 10 May, entrepreneur Herman Dost abruptly proclaimed himself successor, retracting the claim the following day. Langendam asserted that "the bullet came from the left".

=== The CDA's sprint finish (1–15 May 2002) ===
NIPO's survey of 1 May 2002 displayed an electorate split almost evenly among four blocs. Labour led narrowly with 30 projected seats, followed by the CDA at 29, LPF at 26, and the VVD at 24. Against the 1998 election this forecast implied major retreats of 15 seats for the labour and 14 for the VVD, whereas the CDA looked set to retain its strength. The Socialists and ChristenUnie hovered near seven and six seats respectively, the SGP at two, and Leefbaar Nederland at two, while the United Seniors Party edged toward entering parliament with a single seat. In contrast, a series of face-to-face interviews conducted by the NKO (National Kiezersonderzoek, National Voter Study) in April – and only published after the election – showed the CDA leading at 20.7%, with Labour as runner-up at 13.4%.

NIPO's final projection (first after the assassination), published on 14 May, displayed the CDA as the emergent frontrunner at 31 seats. The LPF advanced to 28, Labour and the VVD trailed at 25, and Livable Netherlands remained at two. Analysts observed that bereaved Fortuyn sympathisers often chose the CDA because that party had declined to demonise their leader and kept open the prospect of cooperation with the LPF. At the same time, renewed concern for "norms and values," of which the CDA was considered an "issue owner", gained salience after the assassination, giving the CDA critical momentum into the election.

Voting on 15 May delivered the Christian Democrats a major victory with 43 seats, eclipsing NIPO's survey by 12. The LPF captured 26 seats, matching NIPO's projection, while Labour fell to 23 and the VVD to 24. Pollsters had underestimated the CDA and overstated GroenLinks, which stopped at 11 despite expectations near 15. NIPO analysts conceded that the principle that late momentum magnifies at the ballot box had been undervalued in weighting models. With campaigning suspended and news scarce, news headlines proclaiming CDA Leads on the eve of voting nudged strategic choices among the 15% who decided inside the final 48 hours, transforming polling from a descriptive exercise into a catalytic one, to the CDA's benefit.

== Opinion polls ==
| Polling firm | Date | PvdA | VVD | CDA | D66 | GL | SP | CU | SGP | LPF | LN | VSP | Lead |
|---|---|---|---|---|---|---|---|---|---|---|---|---|---|
| Interview/NSS | 14 May 2002 | 26 | 25 | 35 | 9 | 13 | 8 | 5 | 2 | 24 | 3 | 0 | 9 |
| NIPO | 13 May 2002 | 25 | 25 | 31 | 8 | 14 | 8 | 6 | 2 | 28 | 2 | 1 | 3 |
| NIPO | 1 May 2002 | 30 | 24 | 29 | 7 | 14 | 7 | 6 | 2 | 26 | 4 | 1 | 1 |
| Interview/NSS | 2 Mar 2002 | 34 | 28 | 31 | 8 | 11 | 7 | 7 | 3 | 13 | 8 | 0 | 3 |
| Interview/NSS | 6 Oct 2001 | 45 | 41 | 26 | 6 | 13 | 6 | 6 | 4 | – | 3 | – | 4 |
| 1998 election | 6 May 1998 | 45 | 38 | 29 | 14 | 11 | 5 | 3 | 3 | – | – | – | 7 |

== Result ==
Never in the modern electoral history of the Netherlands has there been so great a shift as on 15 May 2002. Even observers who had predicted increasing voter instability, as foreseen in the quotation that begins this article, were taken aback at the size of voter change in 2002. Nor was the change dramatic from only a national perspective: based on the Pedersen index of electoral volatility or instability at the aggregate level, the Dutch election of 2002 ranks fourth among all West European general elections in the period 1900–2002. Only the Italian elections of 1994, the German elections of 1920 and the French elections of 1906 (Note: In 1906, France held both legislative and presidential elections) proved more unstable than that in the Netherlands in 2002.

— Van Holsteyn et al., Never a dull moment: Pim Fortuyn and the Dutch parliamentary election of 2002

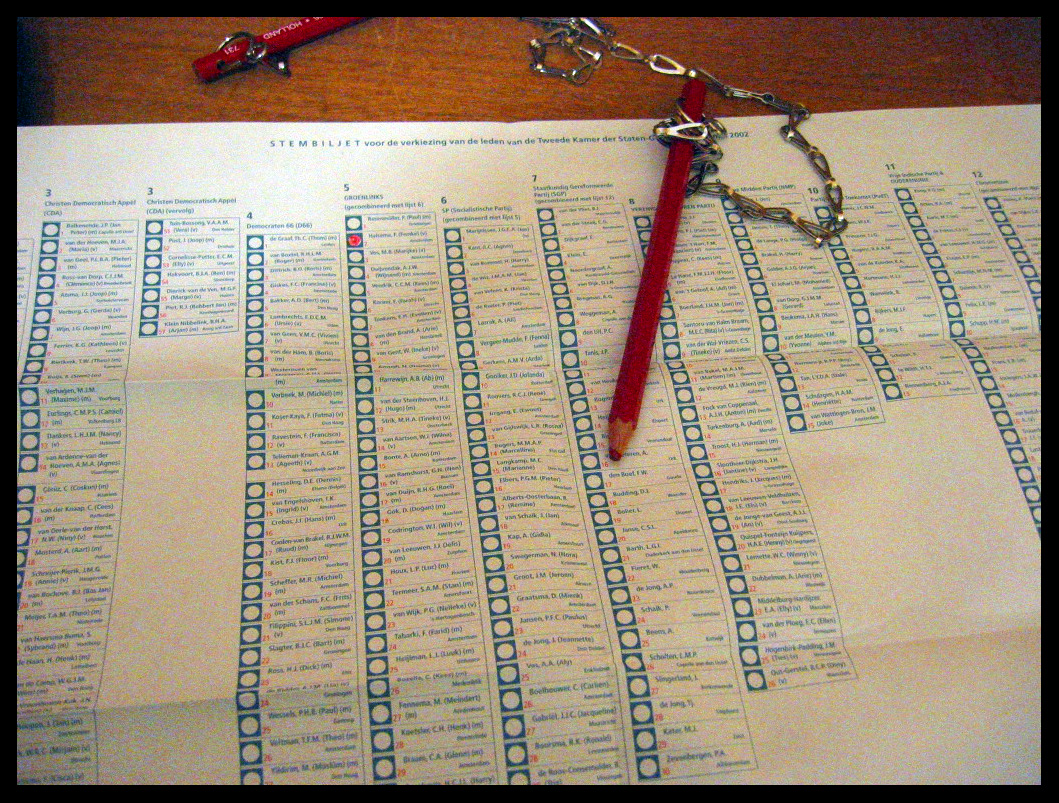
Ballot for the 2002 Dutch general election ballot, Amsterdam

The great losers of the election were Labour Party, People's Party for Freedom and Democracy and Democrats 66, the coalition parties of the 'purple' cabinets. Especially the Labour Party under the technocratic leadership of Ad Melkert suffered a landslide defeat.

The Christian Democratic Appeal was the surprising winner of the election, gaining 14 seats (from 29 to 43) and becoming the largest party in the House of Representatives. This success is in part owed to its new leader Jan Peter Balkenende, who went on to become prime minister, and to its neutral attitude in the debate with Fortuyn, not having participated in the supposed ‘demonization’ by the political Left.

Fortuyn's former party Livable Netherlands also contested the election. While they had been overshadowed by Fortuyn, they also entered the House of Representatives, winning 2 seats.

| Party | Votes | % | Seats | +/– |
|---|---|---|---|---|
| Christian Democratic Appeal | 2,653,723 | 27.93 | 43 | +14 |
| Pim Fortuyn List | 1,614,801 | 17.00 | 26 | New |
| People's Party for Freedom and Democracy | 1,466,722 | 15.44 | 24 | –14 |
| Labour Party | 1,436,023 | 15.11 | 23 | –22 |
| GroenLinks | 660,692 | 6.95 | 10 | –1 |
| Socialist Party | 560,447 | 5.90 | 9 | +4 |
| Democrats 66 | 484,317 | 5.10 | 7 | –7 |
| Christian Union | 240,953 | 2.54 | 4 | –1 |
| Reformed Political Party | 163,562 | 1.72 | 2 | –1 |
| Livable Netherlands | 153,055 | 1.61 | 2 | New |
| United Seniors Party | 39,005 | 0.41 | 0 | New |
| Free Indian Party and Elderly Union | 10,033 | 0.11 | 0 | New |
| Durable Netherlands | 9,058 | 0.10 | 0 | New |
| Party of the Future | 6,393 | 0.07 | 0 | New |
| New Middle Party | 2,305 | 0.02 | 0 | New |
| Republican People's Party | 63 | 0.00 | 0 | New |
| Total | 9,501,152 | 100.00 | 150 | 0 |
| Valid votes | 9,501,152 | 99.85 | | |
| Invalid/blank votes | 14,074 | 0.15 | | |
| Total votes | 9,515,226 | 100.00 | | |
| Registered voters/turnout | 12,035,935 | 79.06 | | |
Source: Kiesraad

=== By province ===
The CDA increased its vote share in every province and secured a plurality in all except Groningen. This marks a significant shift from 1998, where the CDA failed to secure a plurality in any province. In Groningen, which had been the Labour's second-strongest province in 1998 with 37.1% of the vote, the CDA received 22.2% in 2002—still trailing the PvdA's 23.9%, but closing the gap to just 1.7 percentage points, representing a tightening compared to the 21.1-point deficit the CDA had faced there in 1998 (CDA at 16.0% vs. PvdA at 37.1%).

In terms of vote share, the CDA's strongest province was Overijssel, where it reached 36.9%, followed by Limburg (36.7%) and Zeeland (29.6 percent). The CDA's weakest province was North Holland at 20.6%; Groningen, despite the lost plurality, stood at 22.2% and was the second‑weakest.

Measured by relative improvement between 1998 and 2002, the biggest improvement in Zeeland, adding 12.39% to the CDA tally. Close behind were Limburg (+12.36) and Gelderland (+10.3). The smallest gain occurred in Groningen at +6.2 points; Friesland was next‑smallest at +6.7 points.

The CDA garnered the most votes in South Holland (479 540 votes), North Brabant (450 606) and Gelderland (364 064). Combined, these provinces comprise 48.8% of the CDA's 2 653 723 vote total.

Results by province
| Province | CDA | LPF | VVD | PvdA | GL | SP | D66 | CU | SGP | LN | Others |
|---|---|---|---|---|---|---|---|---|---|---|---|
| Drenthe | 26.0 | 12.3 | 16.1 | 23.8 | 6.2 | 5.0 | 4.8 | 3.4 | 0.4 | 1.4 | 0.6 |
| Flevoland | 23.6 | 19.3 | 17.2 | 13.7 | 6.7 | 4.8 | 5.0 | 4.5 | 2.3 | 2.2 | 0.7 |
| Friesland | 33.1 | 12.3 | 12.3 | 19.7 | 6.6 | 5.6 | 4.2 | 3.7 | 0.6 | 1.5 | 0.4 |
| Gelderland | 30.7 | 13.9 | 14.8 | 15.2 | 7.1 | 5.4 | 4.8 | 3.1 | 3.3 | 1.3 | 0.4 |
| Groningen | 22.2 | 12.2 | 12.8 | 23.9 | 8.9 | 6.9 | 5.2 | 5.5 | 0.4 | 1.4 | 0.6 |
| Limburg | 36.7 | 19.0 | 12.3 | 12.4 | 6.8 | 5.8 | 4.1 | 0.4 | 0.1 | 1.7 | 0.7 |
| North Brabant | 32.5 | 17.6 | 15.9 | 11.8 | 6.4 | 7.1 | 5.0 | 0.7 | 0.4 | 1.6 | 1.0 |
| North Holland | 20.6 | 17.6 | 18.2 | 16.5 | 8.7 | 7.3 | 6.5 | 1.2 | 0.3 | 2.0 | 1.1 |
| Overijssel | 36.9 | 11.2 | 12.1 | 15.7 | 5.9 | 4.7 | 4.1 | 5.2 | 2.4 | 1.3 | 0.5 |
| South Holland | 24.0 | 22.3 | 15.8 | 14.3 | 5.9 | 5.0 | 5.0 | 2.7 | 2.8 | 1.6 | 0.6 |
| Utrecht | 25.9 | 15.2 | 17.4 | 13.1 | 8.4 | 6.0 | 5.9 | 3.7 | 2.3 | 1.6 | 0.5 |
| Zeeland | 29.6 | 15.6 | 14.0 | 13.2 | 5.3 | 4.5 | 3.8 | 3.7 | 8.1 | 1.5 | 0.7 |

=== Five largest municipalities ===
In the five largest Dutch municipalities—Amsterdam, Rotterdam, The Hague, Utrecht, and Eindhoven—the CDA saw consistent gains compared to 1998, though its urban performance lagged behind its broader national success. It secured only one plurality, in Eindhoven, where it reached 25.3%, up from 16.2% in 1998: a gain of 9.1 percentage points. In the other cities, CDA increases ranged from 4.3 points in Amsterdam to 7.7 in Utrecht, landing between 10.4% and 17.9% of the vote. These were meaningful jumps but insufficient to lead in cities where either Labour or the LPF dominated.

Labour retained pluralities in Amsterdam (23.4%) and Utrecht (18.3%) but suffered heavy losses from 1998 across all five cities. Its sharpest declines were in Rotterdam (−16.0 points) and Eindhoven (−15.0), with more moderate drops in Amsterdam (−8.8) and Utrecht (−10.9). The decline in vote share was consistent and steep enough to erase its lead in Eindhoven and Rotterdam, where it had dominated four years earlier.

The LPF won outright in Rotterdam with 29.6% and in The Hague with 22.8%, and placed second in Amsterdam (16.6%) and Eindhoven (17.7%). Its lowest showing was in Utrecht at 13.8%, still higher than D66 or the SP. In Rotterdam, the LPF led Labour by 9%, while in The Hague it finished 4% ahead of the VVD and 6% ahead of Labour.

Other established parties generally lost ground. VVD declines ranged from −5.15 points in Utrecht to −11.78 in ’s‑Gravenhage. D66 fell by −4.31 to −7.25 points, GroenLinks by roughly −0.9 to −1.8 points, while the SP added between +0.28 and +6.34 points, its largest gain occurring in Amsterdam.

Results in the five largest municipalities
| Municipality | CDA | LPF | VVD | PvdA | GL | SP | D66 | SGP | CU | LN | Others |
|---|---|---|---|---|---|---|---|---|---|---|---|
| Amsterdam | 10.4 (38 518) | 16.5 (61 185) | 14.4 (53 243) | 23.4 (86 601) | 13.2 (48 707) | 10.8 (40 052) | 7.7 (28 349) | 0.1 (352) | 1.0 (3 527) | 1.4 (5 052) | 1.1 (4 199) |
| Rotterdam | 15.7 (47 023) | 29.6 (88 861) | 11.8 (35 321) | 20.4 (61 127) | 7.2 (21 483) | 6.3 (18 778) | 4.4 (13 192) | 0.8 (2 393) | 1.6 (4 727) | 1.4 (4 317) | 0.9 (2 663) |
| The Hague | 17.9 (45 077) | 22.8 (57 446) | 18.9 (47 749) | 16.6 (41 794) | 8.0 (20 183) | 5.5 (13 860) | 6.3 (15 810) | 0.5 (1 345) | 1.3 (3 237) | 1.3 (3 228) | 1.0 (2 398) |
| (Utrecht (municipality)) Utrecht | 17.4 (26 533) | 13.8 (21 140) | 15.0 (22 920) | 18.3 (27 969) | 14.3 (21 867) | 9.4 (14 346) | 8.0 (12 159) | 0.3 (521) | 1.4 (2 182) | 1.5 (2 283) | 0.6 (922) |
| Eindhoven | 25.3 (29 310) | 17.7 (20 540) | 15.0 (17 397) | 14.4 (16 643) | 8.6 (9 936) | 8.6 (10 000) | 6.2 (7 236) | 0.1 (128) | 1.0 (1 202) | 1.8 (2 043) | 1.3 (1 531) |

=== By policy issue ===
Most important policy issues (top two cited) by intended vote, 4–5 May 2002
| Policy issue | CDA | LPF | VVD | PvdA | GL | SP | D66 | All respondents |
|---|---|---|---|---|---|---|---|---|
| Combating crime and insecurity | 58 | 65 | 67 | 50 | 26 | 38 | 45 | 53 |
| Improving healthcare quality | 44 | 38 | 28 | 41 | 44 | 44 | 43 | 38 |
| Stricter asylum admission policy | 22 | 44 | 27 | 14 | 6 | 4 | 16 | 21 |
| Restoring norms and values | 29 | 10 | 13 | 20 | 15 | 9 | 27 | 21 |
| Improving education quality | 13 | 4 | 12 | 16 | 32 | 25 | 25 | 15 |
| Protecting the socially vulnerable | 8 | 5 | 2 | 18 | 11 | 27 | 8 | 10 |
| Countering price increases | 6 | 7 | 5 | 8 | 2 | 15 | 6 | 8 |
| Healthy public finances | 10 | 4 | 7 | 6 | 8 | 2 | 6 | 7 |
| Stimulating economic growth | 4 | 4 | 14 | 2 | 2 | 2 | 10 | 6 |
| Combating terrorism | 6 | 10 | 5 | 2 | 2 | 0 | 8 | 6 |
| Combating environmental pollution | 3 | 2 | 2 | 6 | 10 | 4 | 4 | 4 |
| Reducing the number of disability beneficiaries | 4 | 6 | 2 | 2 | 0 | 0 | 4 | 3 |
| Increasing citizen participation | 2 | 6 | 3 | 3 | 3 | 2 | 4 | 3 |

=== By prior vote ===
1998 vote → intended vote in 2002 (survey, April 2002)
| 1998 vote (sample size) | CDA | VVD | PvdA | D66 | GL | SP | CU | SGP | LPF | LN | Other | Undecided | Will not vote |
|---|---|---|---|---|---|---|---|---|---|---|---|---|---|
| CDA voters (1998) N = 325 | 73.8 | 1.8 | 0.3 | 1.2 | 1.5 | 0.9 | 1.5 | 0.0 | 3.7 | 0.6 | 1.2 | 13.2 | 0.0 |
| VVD voters (1998) N = 420 | 10.7 | 43.3 | 0.7 | 1.2 | 0.7 | 0.5 | 0.2 | 0.0 | 20.2 | 2.1 | 0.5 | 19.3 | 0.5 |
| PvdA voters (1998) N = 403 | 6.9 | 1.5 | 50.1 | 2.2 | 6.0 | 2.7 | 0.0 | 0.2 | 6.9 | 0.2 | 1.0 | 22.1 | 0.0 |
| D66 voters (1998) N = 168 | 7.7 | 6.0 | 10.7 | 26.2 | 7.7 | 4.2 | 0.0 | 0.0 | 2.4 | 2.4 | 0.6 | 31.5 | 0.6 |
| GL voters (1998) N = 99 | 2.0 | 1.0 | 2.0 | 1.0 | 62.6 | 8.1 | 0.0 | 0.0 | 10.1 | 0.0 | 0.0 | 12.1 | 1.0 |
| SP voters (1998) N = 64 | 1.6 | 0.0 | 1.6 | 1.6 | 4.7 | 56.3 | 0.0 | 0.0 | 12.5 | 0.0 | 0.0 | 20.3 | 1.6 |
| CU voters (1998) N = 59 | 10.2 | 0.0 | 0.0 | 0.0 | 1.7 | 0.0 | 67.8 | 3.4 | 5.1 | 0.0 | 1.7 | 8.5 | 1.7 |
| SGP voters (1998) N = 30 | 0.0 | 0.0 | 0.2 | 0.0 | 0.0 | 0.0 | 6.7 | 90.0 | 0.0 | 0.0 | 0.0 | 3.3 | 0.0 |
| Other voters (1998) N = 21 | 9.5 | 0.0 | 4.8 | 0.0 | 4.8 | 9.5 | 0.0 | 0.0 | 9.5 | 0.0 | 23.8 | 28.6 | 4.8 |
| Non‑voters in 1998 N = 137 | 13.9 | 5.1 | 3.6 | 1.5 | 1.5 | 2.9 | 1.5 | 0.0 | 29.2 | 2.9 | 0.7 | 20.4 | 16.8 |
| Not eligible in 1998 N = 17 | 23.5 | 11.8 | 0.0 | 0.0 | 17.6 | 11.8 | 0.0 | 0.0 | 11.8 | 0.0 | 0.0 | 23.5 | 0.0 |

=== Maps ===
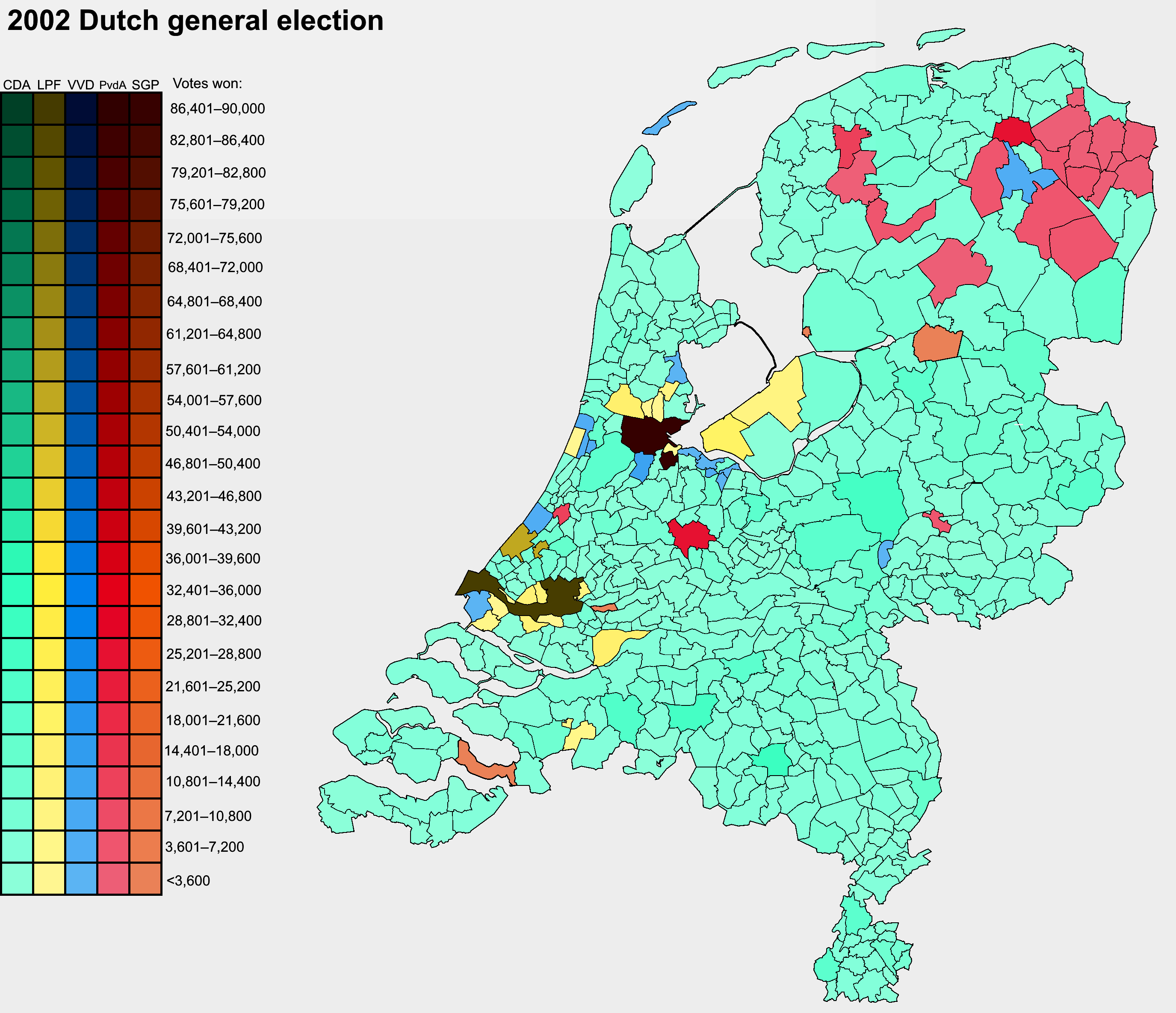
Results by municipality, shaded according to total votes won by largest party

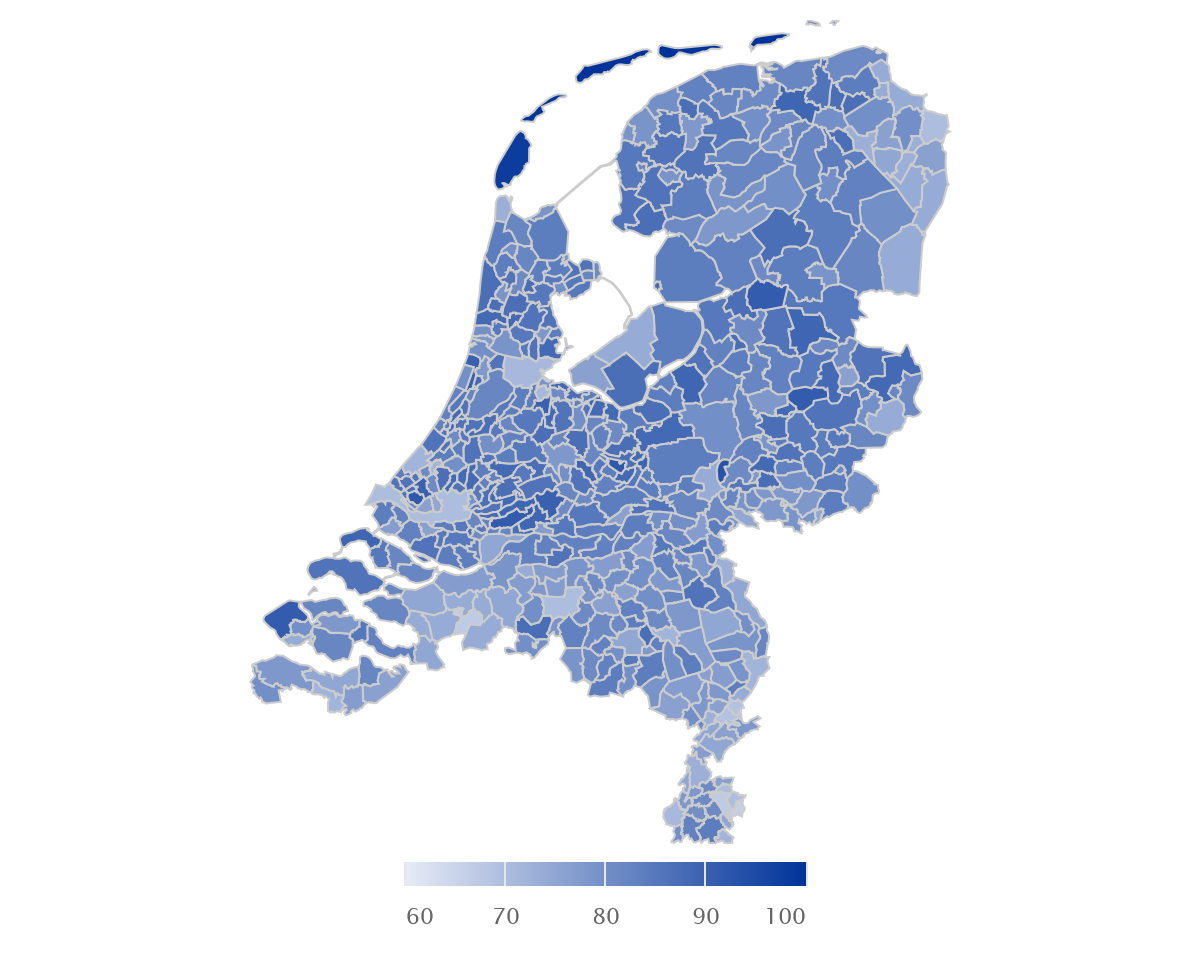
Voter turnout by municipality

Results by province, shaded according to the vote share won by largest party

== Aftermath ==
=== Labour Party (May–November 2002) ===
The Labour Party anticipated a setback yet was shocked by the loss of 22 seats on 15 May—its then-steepest decline ever (Note: In the 2017 election, Labour went on to suffer a greater decline of 29 seats) and worse than the CDA’ record loss in 1994. Melkert resigned on the night following the election under pressure from Koole and Kok. He remained in parliament until he later accepted an executive directorship at the World Bank, an appointment unsuccessfully opposed by LPF house representatives. In his valedictory remarks, Melkert warned against reflexive national self‑loathing and maintained that the 2002 platform remained a sound basis for opposition. On 16 May, the caucus elected Jeltje van Nieuwenhoven its chair, though she disclaimed party leadership.

Campaign strategist Jacques Monasch later criticized an excessive focus on macro‑economics at the expense of healthcare, security and immigration, and his chronicle De Strijd om de Macht (The Struggle for Power) depicted a divided team centred obsessively on Melkert. Political scientist Philip van Praag faulted the re‑use of the 1994 and 1998 playbooks, while campaign director Dick Benschop acknowledged vacillation between defending the coalition record and promising change. The executive created two panels. The De Boer committee on political direction, chaired by Meta de Boer, and the Andersson committee on organisation and culture. De Boer's report, De Kaasstolp aan Diggelen, charged the campaign with scripting "the wrong protagonist," condemned Koole and colleagues for clinging to bureaucratic style after the disastrous 6 March debate, and highlighted deeper identity erosion on multiculturalism, meritocracy, democracy and Europe. Andersson urged more tiers of memberships, primary‑style selections and structured dialogue through digital platforms and local meetings.

On 24 May, Koole proposed that members, not MPs, should elect the new parliamentary leader by referendum in the autumn; the Political Forum endorsed the idea on 1 June, and in July the executive scheduled a November ballot for the Lower‑House chair, the Senate lead and possibly provincial list‑leaders. Rules adopted on 2 September required an absolute majority and at least 15 percent turnout, failing which the caucus would regain the appointment right. Former state‑secretary Wouter Bos, encouraged by 120 000 preference votes in the May election, entered the race on 27 August, promising an open debate and clearer positions; ex‑minister Klaas de Vries joined on 29 September, urging closer ties with D66 and GroenLinks, while vice‑chair Adri Duivesteijn withdrew. Incumbent van Nieuwenhoven announced in October, and public hustings followed. Bos argued for curbing mortgage relief for higher earners; De Vries mocked VVD leader Zalm over the cabinet collapse. On 12 November Bos won decisively with 60 percent of the 32 000 ballots cast, interpreted as members’ appetite for generational renewal.

=== VVD (May–September 2002) ===
Following the VVD's electoral defeat, Dijkstal stepped down as party leader, and on 16 May the new parliamentary group unanimously elected former finance minister Gerrit Zalm as its chair. Zalm went on to distance himself from the purple coalition for making too many half-hearted compromises. On 16 August, Dijkstal announced his departure from parliament effective 1 September, citing internal party shifts and post-election turmoil as obstacles to his effectiveness.

=== Cabinet formation (May–July 2002) ===
Queen Beatrix appointed the CDA jurist Piet Hein Donner as informateur on 17 May 2002, directing him to assemble a cabinet that could rely on constructive parliamentary cooperation. Donner soon centred talks on a coalition of CDA and LPF, preferably with the VVD; the left‑wing parties and the small Christian formations opted for opposition. The VVD, shaken by its electoral losses, initially favoured an external‑support model and proposed that CDA and LPF govern as a minority. Balkenende and LPF leader Mat Herben rejected that formula, and on 23 May the VVD caucus agreed—grudgingly—to full participation, provided that substantial liberal planks be enacted. Negotiations opened the same day. Consensus formed quickly on €10 billion in fiscal retrenchment and on a tougher asylum regime. The LPF secured agreement on elected mayors, but its demands for a directly elected prime minister, a corrective referendum, and the suspension of the Betuweroute freight line were blocked by its partners.

In late June, Donner consolidated the results into the Strategic Accord Working on Trust: Getting Down to Business. The draft, approved by the negotiators on 28 June and by their caucuses on 3 July, reflected campaign priorities: public security, healthcare, education and immigrant integration preceded socio‑economic and external affairs. Policy highlights included stricter criminal sentencing, demand‑driven medical care, limits on school mergers, mandatory civic‑integration courses, and tighter family‑reunification rules. Each party gained a flagship concession: a life‑course savings scheme for the CDA, abolition of the property tax (Onroerendezaakbelasting) for the VVD, and removal of the kwartje van Kok (a 25-cent excise tax on petrol) for the LPF. Institutional reform was confined to elected mayors; referendums disappeared, and Fortuyn's broader anti‑bureaucratic and Eurosceptic themes were largely absent. Although the opposition denounced the accord in a 4 July debate—citing scant renewal, WAO cutbacks, and neglect of hospital wait lists—the queen that afternoon named Balkenende formateur, tasking him chiefly with divvying portfolios.

Portfolio bargaining proved more fractious than policy drafting. Under pressure from its restless caucus, the LPF repeatedly sent Herben back to demand a Justice‑based Ministry of Immigration and a stronger integration remit. On 10 July the parties struck a final bargain: six CDA ministers, four each for LPF and VVD, and fourteen junior posts divided five‑five‑four. Minor concessions on the integration brief quelled remaining dissent, and on 11 July all factions ratified the list. Balkenende interviewed candidates through the following week; on 22 July the queen swore in the first Balkenende cabinet. Balkenende became prime minister and minister of general affairs, with Johan Remkes (VVD) and Eduard Bomhoff (LPF) as deputy prime ministers at Interior and Health. Other key posts went to Piet Hein Donner (CDA, Justice), Jaap de Hoop Scheffer (CDA, Foreign Affairs), Hans Hoogervorst (VVD, Finance), Herman Heinsbroek (LPF, Economic Affairs), Cees Veerman (CDA, Agriculture), and Hilbrand Nawijn (LPF, immigration).

Only one day later, LPF State Secretary for Social Affairs and Work Opportunity Philomena Bijlhout resigned after it was reported that she had failed to disclose her past membership in a Surinamese militia group.

=== LPF internal conflicts (May–October 2002) ===
Two days after the election, MP Leon Geurts was rejected from the LPF's parliamentary caucus after it was found he had falsified parts of his CV, including making an unverified claim that he was a doctorandus in economics from Erasmus University Rotterdam. He subsequently stepped down from the House and retired from politics citing media pressure and threats made to his LPF colleagues.

After the election, the LPF gradually descended into administrative chaos: correspondence went unanswered, the membership register was incomplete, and treasurer Herman Dost blocked any audit of party accounts. To force a reset, MPs installed an eight‑member interim board on 5 June, but this was decried as an imposed regime with no involvement from grassroots supporters. Regional coordinators feared marginalisation, and founding board members Dost and Peter Langendam turned against the new statutes that limited rank‑and‑file voting rights. On 27 June they revoked the interim board's mandate, prompting MPs to threaten secession. After mediation by major donors, a compromise kept Langendam and Dostuntil a July assembly, yet they resigned under pressure on 2 and 3 July respectively and ceded authority to businessman Ed Maas and lawyer Cees van Leeuwen.Although an extraordinary gathering of 800 members endorsed Maas's reorganisation mandate, divisions persisted; online entrepreneur Ruud Both, Dost's ally, initially denounced the procedure and vowed a rival meeting, but still ended up taking a position under Maas.

The parliamentary group soon fractured over strategy and leadership. Polls showing an eleven‑seat slump intensified dissatisfaction with Mat Herben's negotiation style and perceived leniency toward coalition partners. Exhausted, Herben announced his departure on 8 August, effective 1 September; on 20 August the caucus elevated Harry Wijnschenk, a former VVD municipal councillor and motor‑magazine seller, who immediately apologised for the party's turmoil and created a nine‑member executive team. His tenure began in scandal: television revealed MP Willem van der Velden's adviser formerly had ties to the far-right centre party and CP86, (20 August) and Algemeen Dagblad alleged that MP Cor Eberhard had concealed a criminal past (24 August); both were temporarily suspended. Wijnschenk, under stress, first denied then admitted knowing the adviser and drafted a loyalty pledge renouncing extremism. Eberhard threatened legal action, the newspaper retracted its claim (31 August), and he returned, deepening mutual distrust. On 26 September, MP Winny de Jong threatened to defect from the party unless Winschenk stepped down, accusing him of having purchased his seat.

By early October the party verged on open schism. A 1 October meeting expelled De Jong and Eberhard after ten hours of discussion; they remained in the house as Groep De Jong. This provoked provincial chairs to condemn Wijnschenk and Hoogendijk and to demand their removal. On 30 September, Wijnschenk unilaterally urged Economics Minister Herman Heinsbroek to assume political leadership of the LPF, shocking both the interim board and Deputy Prime Minister Eduard Bomhoff. Heinsbroek expressed conditional interest if Bomhoff relinquished his post. However, Bornhoff refused, and Maas opposed the gambit. On 2 October, Wijnshenk accused Maas of using his position to reward "real estate friends" with political power. A crisis conference on 3 October produced a fragile truce: Wijnschenk retracted accusations against Maas, and unity was proclaimed for the cameras. Two days later, however, all twelve provincial chairs withdrew confidence in Wijnschenk and called for reconciliation with the expelled MPs; interim chair Maas voiced willingness to see dissidents form a separate faction. Wijnschenk refused to step down, scheduling a confidence vote for 16 October—delayed by Prince Claus's death (6 October).

=== Cabinet disintegration (October 2002) ===
Mounting strife within the LPF placed the first Balkenende cabinet under acute strain in October 2002. Two rival camps crystallised: Bomhoff aligned with interim party chair Maas, whereas Heinsbroek backed parliamentary leader Wijnschenk. On 4 October Balkenende still dismissed questions about LPF discord. During an assembly on 5 October, Heinsbroek was the only minister to publicly support Weinschenk, while Bomhoff was publicly neutral. Heinsbroek denounced Bomhoff's neutral speech as a lulverhaal ("bullshit"), and the pair clashed again when Bomhoff urged revisions to Central Planning Bureau models, to which Heinsbroek objected. Viewing their feud as a threat to government viability, Balkenende warned at the 11 October cabinet meeting that the squabbling must cease; VVD leader Zalm echoed the concern on 13 October, saying a cabinet could not function with two ministers "who can't stand the sight of each other."

On 13 October LPF ministers convened and, by majority, demanded Bomhoff's resignation; ministers Khee Liang Phoa and Cees van Leeuwen dissented. After Prince Claus's funeral on 15 October, LPF ministers withdrew confidence in both Bomhoff and Heinsbroek, yet they refused to step aside, each insisting the parliamentary caucus should decide. Balkenende suspended that evening's cabinet session, warning he would govern only if the LPF united behind its leader and both ministers resigned voluntarily. The next morning, before talks resumed, Zalm and CDA parliamentary leader Maxime Verhagen declared their trust in the coalition exhausted. Bomhoff and Heinsbroek agreed to quit, but the decision was moot: Balkenende informed Parliament that his cabinet had lost its basis and tendered his resignation to the Queen. Bomhoff's later memoir, Blinde Ambitie (published 19 December 2002), quoting confidential cabinet deliberations, prompted an inquiry into possible breach of official secrecy.

Immediately after the collapse, Balkenende and Verhagen signalled readiness to continue with the VVD but not the LPF, noting polls that hinted at a joint majority of 77 to 79 seats. LPF ministers petitioned Queen Beatrix on 21 October for a "glueing attempt," even offering to cede a portfolio, yet CDA and VVD dismissed the overture as "a passed station." Following consultations with her constitutional advisers and parliamentary leaders—none but the LPF favoured salvaging the coalition—the Queen accepted the resignation. Balkende set 22 January 2003 for new elections, allowing time for new parties to register by 28 October. Balkenende explained the date as the earliest practicable moment satisfying the House's wish for rapid elections. In the intervening caretaker period the portfolios of the departed LPF ministers were reassigned to CDA and VVD colleagues—Aart Jan de Geus took Health and the deputy premiership from Bomhoff, while Hans Hoogervorst assumed Economic Affairs from Heinsbroek.

=== Snap election (October 2002 – January 2003) ===
In 2003, the LPF lost as spectacularly as it won in 2002, with its seat count dropping from 26 to 8. Commentators attributed the result to voters feeling that the LPF had become rudderless without its original leader and that the government had already implemented some of its policies, but argued disaffected LPF supporters would still back an "anti-establishment" party if a viable option was available.

The race of which party would become the largest was eventually won by the CDA, which went from 43 to 44 seats, ensuring a continuation of Balkenende's career as prime minister.

After severe disagreements had frustrated the formation of a CDA-PvdA cabinet, a CDA-VVD-D66 cabinet was formed on 27 May 2003, with Balkenende as prime minister.

== Legacy ==
In 2022, the 2002 election was depicted in a TV drama named Het jaar van Fortuyn (The Year of Fortuyn); the final episode aired on 22 April. Later that year, Melkert was interviewed by Dik Verkuil, a journalist for NOS. Verkuil described Melkert as still thinking the same way he did in 2002. Melkert ascribed Fortuyn's success to his sensationalist rhetoric and described receiving countless threats after the assassination. Melkert stated: "Fortuyn was eloquent, certainly, and had considerable knowledge of the issues, but he used that for sensationalism, not to get anything done. He was the precursor to Trump."

== See also ==
- List of candidates in the 2002 Dutch general election
