= Virginia Kapić =

Dutch radical right-wing political activist of Indo/Croatian background

- Kapić at a demonstration of the National Alliance in the Netherlands
- Born: December 8, 1978 (age 47)
- Years active: 2002–2008
- Organizations: Stormfront; Dutch People's Union; New National Party; National Alliance
- Notable work: De Ongeliefde Waarheid
- Movement: Neo-Nazism; Far-right politics; Neo-fascism; White nationalism; White supremacy
- Website: Official website

Virginia Kapić (born December 8, 1978) is a Dutch former far-right political activist. She was co-founder of the National Alliance in the Netherlands. Before that she was active in the Dutch People's Union (Nederlandse Volks-Unie, abbr. NVU) and the New National Party (Nieuwe Nationale Partij, abbr. NNP).

== Internet activities ==
Kapić was first noted when in late 2002 she was active under the name Herr Doktor on the white nationalist internet forum Stormfront.

== Political activities ==
At the same time she became a member of the outspoken neo-Nazi party NVU. She left it after getting into a row with its leader Constant Kusters, whom she first admired and then loathed. A few months later she became a member of the white nationalist party NNP where she became a board member of the party's youth group.

In November 2003 she co-founded the National Alliance with Jan Teijn. Kapić became party secretary and administrator of the website.

== Antisemitism ==
In 2004 Kapić was named in the sixth Monitor Racism and Extreme-right by Jaap van Donselaar and Peter R. Rodrigues of the Anne Frank Foundation, in which several antisemitic remarks of her were cited. On the NA forum she wrote among others: "I believe that the Jews are a completely separate creation. They are other than all other creations on Mother Earth and to me they represent evil. Because they are evil, I would exterminate them like is done to cockroaches." A NA spokesperson said that the remarks were a 'youthful indiscretion' and that Kapić' viewpoints had become 'refined'. She also said that "Jews don't belong in Europe and they can only live here because (we) the whites, allow them to exist."

== Neo-Nazi activities ==
In March 2005 Kapić was arrested in Belgium together with a fellow party member when she participated in a paramilitary training camp of the Flemish neo-Nazi group Bloed, Bodem, Eer en Trouw (Blood, Soil, Honor and Loyalty). The group patrolled the surroundings wearing masks, battledresses and carrying night vision equipment. During a police raid, Nazi propaganda materials and stabbing weapons were confiscated.

Shortly after being arrested Kapić resigned as NA party secretary. She stayed active in the background and would act as a liaison between the National Alliance and the British-originated network of Blood & Honour. She also called upon party supporters to follow the example of terror suspects Samir Azzouz and Mohammed Bouyeri. Later she explained that she meant "taking an example of having a rock solid faith."

== Book ==
In december 2008 Kapić released a book, titled De Ongeliefde Waarheid (The Unloved Truth), in which she made more antisemitic remarks (e.g. "they (the Jews) control the media and rule the US.") and also denied the Holocaust (e.g. "(there exist) no documents that Adolf Hitler and his people ever gave the order that Jews should be gassed." and that "(Hitler) wanted to get rid of them through bullying, which later resulted in concentration camps where work was done" to which she added "labor is ennobling.")

== Personal life ==
Kapić was born in Rotterdam on December 8, 1978 of Indo/Croatian background and speaks Dutch and Croatian.
