= Wim Beaux =

Dutch politician (born 1930)

Willem Jozua Beaux

Member of the Provincial States of Flevoland
- In office 1986–1987

Member of the Municipal Council of Almere
- In office 1986–1990

Member of the Municipal Council of Amsterdam
- In office 1990–1994

Personal details
- Born: 1930 Amsterdam, Netherlands
- Party: CP (1980–1986), CP'86 (1986–1996), VNN/NNP (1996–2004), NA (2004–2006), NVB (2006-2008)
- Occupation: Politician

Willem Jozua (Wim) Beaux (born 1930) is a Dutch far-right politician who describes himself as a people's nationalist.

== Career ==
Wim Beaux served as a member of the Municipal Council of Almere and the Provincial States of Flevoland for the Centre Party and later for CP'86. In the 1990 Dutch municipal elections, he was the party's top candidate in both Almere and Amsterdam. He was elected in both municipalities but chose to take a seat in the Amsterdam council. In 1995, after the resignation of Henk Ruitenberg due to failed merger attempts, Beaux briefly served as national chairman of CP'86.

In 1991, Beaux was arrested at the Dutch-German border carrying pamphlets for CP'86 and booklets denying the Holocaust. In 1994, on appeal, he was convicted and received a suspended prison sentence and a fine.

Internal conflicts within CP'86 led many members to leave and form the People’s Nationalists Netherlands (Volksnationalisten Nederland, VNN), where Beaux again served briefly as chairman. In that capacity, he and another board member were summoned to court for "racist" publications on the party's website. After being convicted, they were acquitted on appeal because it could not be proven that they personally had posted the texts online.

By 2003, the NNP increasingly sought rapprochement with New Right. NNP chairman Florens van der Kooi became an assistant to New Right leader Michiel Smit. Beaux initially seemed to support this rapprochement but later left the NNP along with two other senior members from North Holland, Peter van Egmond and Ton Steemers. According to Beaux, the main reason for leaving was the incompetence of the party leadership. There were also ideological differences: parts of the NNP membership were dissatisfied with New Right's pro-Israel and pro-Jewish positions, which caused unrest within the party.

Between 2006 and 2008, Beaux was chairman of the Nationalist People's Movement (Nationalistische Volks Beweging), a far-right organization which split off from the NA, whose name and logo reference the NSB.
