= Jan Teijn =

Dutch politician

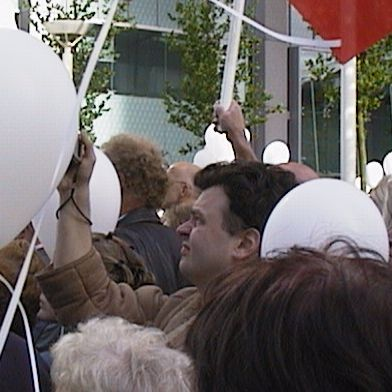

Member of the Municipal council of Rotterdam
- In office 1994–1998

Member of the district council of Feijenoord
- In office 2002–2006

Personal details
- Born: 30 July 1966 Rotterdam, Netherlands
- Party: Centre Democrats (CD); Centre Party '86 (CP'86); New National Party (NNP); National Alliance (NA)

Jan Teijn (born 30 July 1966 in Rotterdam) is a former Dutch far-right politician and activist.

== Centre Democrats and CP'86 ==
Teijn joined the Centre Democrats in 1988. For this party and the more radical CP'86, he served as a member of the Rotterdam city council from 1994 to 1998. When CP'86 split in late 1996 into a moderate and a more radical faction, Teijn sided with the latter. He associated with neo-Nazis and took part in a demonstration calling for the rehabilitation of volunteers of the Waffen-SS and amnesty for collaborators from World War II. Demonstrators carried a banner of the youth organization Germaanse Jeugd in Nederland of the NVU.

== NNP and National Alliance ==
In 2001, Teijn joined the New National Party (NNP), and in 2002 he became a councillor in the Rotterdam district of Feijenoord. In 2003, following an internal conflict, he left the NNP and continued as an independent councillor. Together with Virginia Kapić, formerly active in the NVU and the NNP, he founded the National Alliance. In the 2006 municipal and district elections, the National Alliance failed to win seats in both Feijenoord and the Rotterdam city council. The party was dissolved on 21 July 2007.

As a politician and activist, Teijn campaigned against child pornography and pedophiles, including through a citizens’ initiative to ban the so-called “pedophile party,” the PNVD.

== Prosecution ==
On 14 August 2007, it was announced that the Dutch Public Prosecution Service would prosecute Teijn. He was held responsible for allowing discriminatory statements on the website of the National Alliance, where he served as forum moderator. The anti-discrimination bureau Radar filed a complaint. The prosecution also alleged that Teijn possessed video material involving underage girls. According to Teijn, it concerned "two videos with not very young girls, between 13 and 17 according to the prosecution" and was therefore a "grey area". He was not charged in relation to these videos.

On 2 February 2009, Jan Teijn was convicted for hate-inciting statements on the NA forum—which the court described as "low-minded", "utterly reprehensible" and having a "toxic character"—and for possession of a stun gun. He received a suspended six-month prison sentence and 120 hours of community service.
