= National Alliance (Netherlands) =

National Alliance Nationale Alliantie
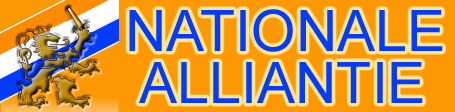
- Chairman: Jan Teijn
- Founded: 11 November 2003
- Dissolved: 21 July 2007
- Split from: New National Party
- Headquarters: Rotterdam, the Netherlands
- Newspaper: Weerstand (Resistance)
- Youth wing: Dietsland Jeugd (Dietsland Youth)
- Ideology: Neo-Nazism; Dutch ultranationalism Anti-capitalism; Hard Euroscepticism; Opposition to NATO; Secularism; Animal rights Aryanism
- Political position: Far-right
- European affiliation: European National Front
- Colours: Orange; White; Blue

Website
- www.nationalealliantie.com (defunct)

The National Alliance (Dutch: Nationale Alliantie, abbr. NA or N.A.) was a Dutch ultranationalist political party. It was disbanded in 2007.

The party was formed on 12 November 2003, by Jan Teijn and Virginia Kapić. Teijn kicked off his political career in the Centrum Democraten in Rotterdam, before going over to the CP'86, where he was one of the local council members in Rotterdam of a national socialist faction. Teijn was elected to the district council in the Feijenoord district for the NNP, before he moved to the NA midterm. They lost that seat in the 2006 elections (302 votes or 1.2%). Kapić, who also came from the NNP, was a known antisemite and holocaust denier.

== Ideology ==
The NA's ideology was based on nationalism and socialism. The party wanted to protect Dutch culture, was in favour of animal rights and against battery cage farming, unnecessary animal testing, fur and leather for which animals have to be slaughtered independent from meat production, against the bio-industry in general, and wanted tougher sentences for criminals. The Party sought the withdrawal of the Netherlands from NATO and the EU and was strongly anticapitalistic. The party also rejected other sexual preferences than heterosexuality. The party displayed itself as a "social and democratic nationalistic political party". Although the party was non-sectarian, they nurtured the Christian standards and values as a part of their national heritage. In April 2005 the party organized a lecture about 'the Aryan roots of Christianity'. In preservation of their cultural heritage, the party celebrated Yule every year, a festivity on the Germanic calendar.

The NA's ideology, although more extreme, was often compared with the New Right of Alain de Benoist.

== Organizational structure ==
The general members conference was the highest institution in the Nationale Alliantie. At this conference, practical and political decisions are made. Members were invited through the party magazine (Weerstand) and the website to participate in this conference. The general conference was organized once a year: as a rule in November. It was also possible to have a members consultation about a subject.

The Nationale Alliantie was run by the board of directors, which existed of a chairman, a treasurer and a secretary for the organisation, chosen by the general members conference. The meetings of the board of directors were attended with an advisory vote by the chairman of the youth organisation Dietsland Jeugd (Dietsland Youth). The members of the board of directors were chosen by the general conference for the period of three years and which were eligible for re-election once. The members of the board of directors had a mutual set of tasks. As of 2007, the board of directors included Jan Teijn (chairman), Mari Kostense (secretary) and Ronald Bredijk (treasurer).

The youth organisation Dietsland Jeugd was an independent political youth organization officially linked to the Nationale Alliantie.

== Activities ==
The NA organized a petition to force Islam out of Europe. They announced its first demonstration, at the beginning of February 2004, in support of a demand for the release of Cees Gardien, who was in jail awaiting his trial for killing Yapcup Yuruyucu, a Turkish immigrant that robbed the garage firm owned by Gardien who uses a wheelchair and has a disability. In June 2004, the NA demonstrated in Utrecht against Turkey in the EU. On 11 June 2005, the NA held a demonstration against the construction of a Surinamese mosque and in November 2004 against Muslim violence after the murder on Theo van Gogh, Dutch writer and film producer who was killed by an extremist.

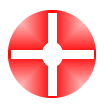
Original logo of the NA, based on a Viking shield

The party demonstrated repeatedly against paedophiliac association MARTIJN, and agitated against paedophilia. The newspaper Trouw reported on 19 September 2006 that the NA informed the neighbours of a minister from Rotterdam, Hans Visser, about the "paedophiliac nature of the minister". The party disapproved of the support of Visser to junks (instead of that the party refers to the organisation Victory Outreach) and illegals and had as a point of view that all paedophiles should be imprisoned for life. Visser, a member of the paedophiliac association MARTIJN considered reporting this to the police because of slander. In June 2006, the party launched a petition (Burgerinitiatief, Citizen Initiative). With this, the Nationale Alliantie wanted to realize a ban on organizations that either glorify paedophilia, incite or have the goal to legalize adult-child sex.

In November 2005, the NA started an offensive against a Dutch company called Scarlet, which offers telephony and broadband internet. This was because of an advertising billboard in which a small girl in lingerie was used. A group of which the NA said it has no connections with spray-painted the billboard of Scarlet with the text "PEDO'S". A few days later, Scarlet announced that they would continue with an amended version of their ad, because of all the complaints.

On 21 March 2005, the International Day for the Elimination of Racial Discrimination, the NA held a demonstration against "leftist fascism" in Rotterdam. On 22 October 2005, the NA invited Tim Mudde, editor-in-chief of Vooraan! to hold a lecture about the extreme-left and antifascists for NA/Dietsland Jeugd members. Pictures of antifascists taken on demonstrations are being posted on the NA forum, in which they offer a cash reward for information leading them to the persons.

In March 2006 the NA participated local elections in Rotterdam and the Feijenoord neighbourhood in Rotterdam. Activists started the electoral campaign by distributing flyers in the centre of Rotterdam, dressed in an orange burqa. The party didn't gain any seats in the local elections.

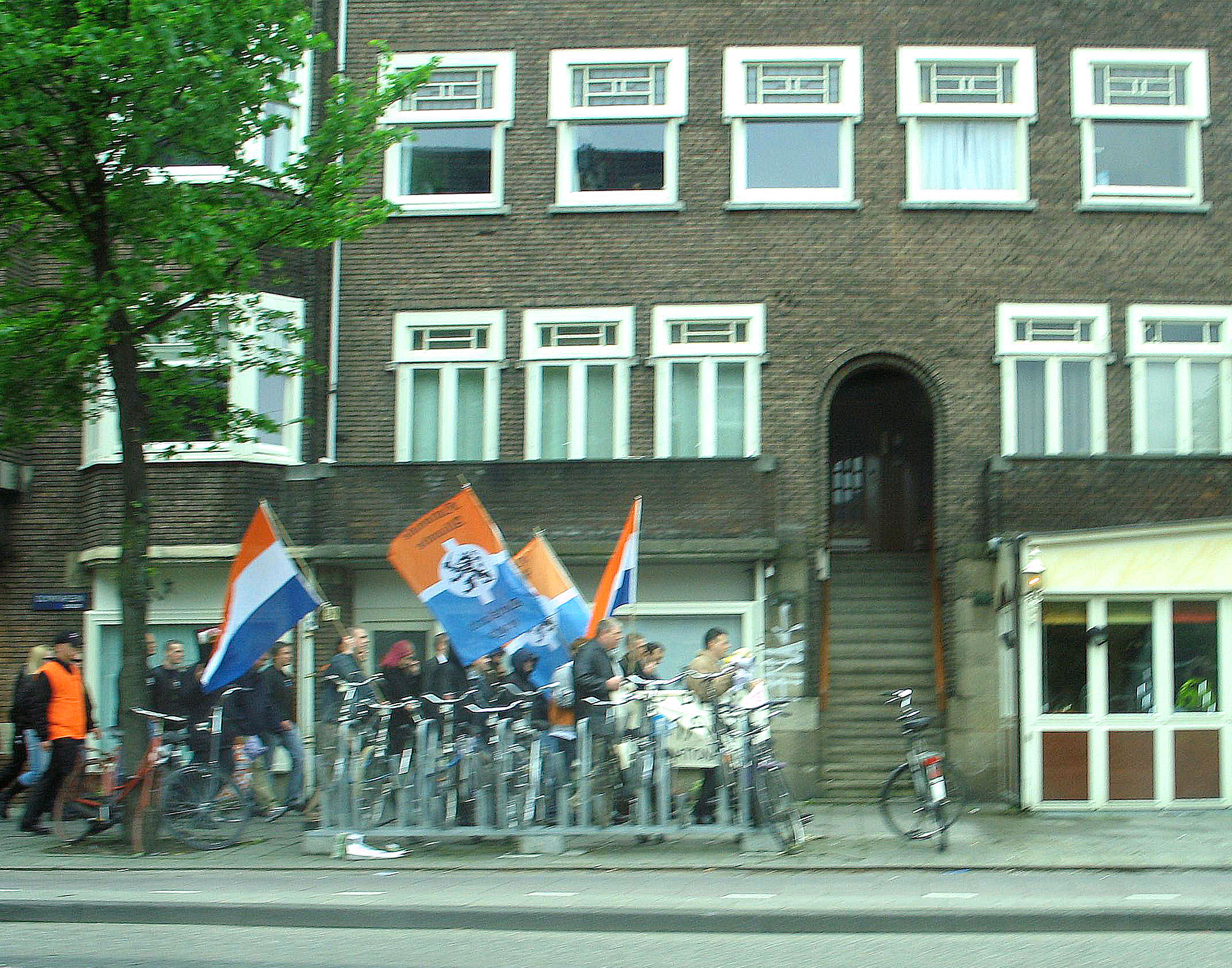
NA demonstration in Amsterdam on 27 May 2006

On 11 June 2005, the NA held a demonstration in Rotterdam against the construction of a Surinamese mosque. The demonstration proceeded peacefully, but the NA was the focus of media attention in June 2005 following an arson attack on their old mosque. Although the NA declared that it had nothing to do with it a Ben van der Kooi, a NA sympathizer was considered the main suspect (the sympathizer was convicted but this conviction was overturned by a higher court in 2006 after a detention of 14 months, as the higher court deemed the evidence inconclusive).

Following the Van der Kooi's arrest, several moderate NA members left the party, while a number of prominent party leaders also canceled their membership but continue to exercise influence behind the scenes.

In September 2006, the NA again became the focus of media attention after 17 members (including 11 soldiers) of Flemish neo-Nazi group Bloed, Bodem, Eer en Trouw (BBET; "Blood, Soil, Honour and Loyalty") were arrested. According to the press, the lead suspect, Tomas Boutens, was organizing the trafficking of weapons, and was developing international links, in particular with the Nationale Alliantie. The Dutch justice department conducted research, at the request of the Belgian authorities, into the Dutch participants, including one of the NA's founders, Virginia Kapić and a former chairman of the NA's youth organisation, in the Leopoldsburg shooting practices. In March last year, twenty Dutch Nazis, including Kapić, took part in a paramilitary training exercise near Spa, organised by Blood & Honour Flanders. They camped in ten tents and had seven military vehicles at their disposal. The Nazis patrolled the area, intimidating passers-by who then informed the police. A search later uncovered stiletto knives and Nazi propaganda. The NA claimed this wasn't true and that the BBET group had only held a lecture (about Zionism and activism) on 29 January 2005 for their youth organization. Their youth organization, however, held a lecture in cooperation with BBET on 28 May 2005 about "Race and reality – to the extinction of the white race?". The NA called on white Dutch people to increase their birthrate and demanded a halt to the building of mosques and the closure of The Netherlands' borders to all migrants and refugees.

In February 2005, the NA organized a lecture about "Disunion of right-wing parties". Their guest speaker was Joop Glimmerveen, the former face and leader of the Dutch People's Union (NVU) since the beginning of the 1970s and party ideologist until the end of the 1990s, now one of the biggest critics of the NVU's current leader Constant Kusters.

== Affiliations ==
The party was associated with the European National Front. In October 2004, the NA was present in Warsaw, Poland, at the first conference of the ENF. On 2 December 2006, a delegation of the NA visited the Corneliu Codreanu Memorial March in Bucharest, Romania, at invitation of Noua Dreaptă and the NPD in Germany in February 2007.

The NA furthermore was present in Flanders every year at the annual IJzerwake ("Yser Vigil"). On 11 September 2004, the NA took part in a demonstration against terrorism which was held in Antwerp (Flanders) in corporation with other Flemish nationalist organizations like Groen Rechts and BBET. On 8 December 2004, the NA joined a demonstration against the invasion of China in Tibet and the violating of human rights of the Tibetan people at the Hague.

On the occasion of the first national congress of the NA held in Rotterdam in 2005, the American national socialist Harold Covington sent a letter in the name of the 'white nationalist movement' in the United States and Canada and extended greetings from all white nationalists in North America. Covington's books were being promoted on the NA forum.
