= Nationalist People's Movement =

Far-right political organization in the Netherlands

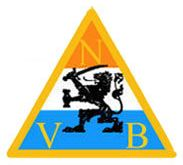
NVB logo

The Nationalist People's Movement (Dutch: Nationalistische Volks Beweging, NVB) was a far-right political organization in the Netherlands. Chairman of the group was Wim Beaux, who was previously active for the Centre Party '86. The NVB was founded in 2006 as a split from the National Alliance, likewise a right-wing extremist organization. The NVB's name, logo and mottoes resembled those of the collaborationist National Socialist Movement of World War II. According to the General Intelligence and Security Service, the NVB "virtually disappeared from the scene" in 2008.

== Activities ==
The group claimed it focused on preserving and protecting the Dutch language and culture on the basis of European identity and Christian norms and values. The NVB tried to achieve its objectives by organizing demonstrations and meetings. The NVB also took part in the IJzerwake and maintained close ties with Voorpost.

== Confrontations ==
- In February 2007, the NVB held a party meeting in Uitgeest, which faced protests from anti-fascists. The confrontation between the two sides led to a fight, in which the court would later designate the anti-fascists as the instigators.
- On Saturday, 22 September 2007, an NVB demonstration in the De Baarsjes district of Amsterdam was ended by police almost as soon as it began, after fighting had broken out between members of the NVB and a group of anti-fascist activists and F-side football hooligans. The demonstration had been prompted by the relocation of a war memorial from the site of the planned Westermoskee.
