= Schiedam riots =

Race riots in Schiedam

The Schiedam riots (in Dutch: Turkenrellen) broke out on 6 August 1976 in Schiedam, Netherlands, when two Dutch teens were stabbed, one fatally, after an argument between two Turkish and five Dutch teens.

== Incidents ==
On 6 August 1976, several Dutch youths planned, and later attacked Turkish bars and residents in the neighbourhood, smashing their windows. Local residents were among the leaders of the clashes. The riot continued for five to six days. The police were passive during the riots, and when trying to stop the rioters, they were also attacked.

In August 1976, five people were prosecuted.

== Aftermath ==
The clashes were seen as hooliganism. Xenophobia as a motive was not reported by the local authorities; they denied any racist motive and their responses were directed against the NVU, and they proposed a ban of the party. Modern researchers see the riots as a collective violence, an ethnic clashes directed against Turks. Marchetti claimed that the riots caused degentrification of areas where Caribbean migrants lived. Dutch research from 1983 claimed that besides the Afrikaanderwijk riots, and Schiedam riots, "the whole general public opinion still is fairly tolerant" in the Netherlands.

The workers argued that because of the events and the exodus of Turks from the neighbourhood, the city's economy had deteriorated, leaving immigrants in a more difficult position.

In August 1986 another attack on Turkish property was registered; three Dutchmen were arrested, and they were led by a participant of the 1976 Schiedam riots.

== In Dutch politics ==
The Dutch parliament believed that NVU played a role in the riots, because the party often published pamphlets related to the clashes. Their content was reportedly inciting to riot and racial hatred. Distributors were arrested and later charged, including Joop Glimmerveen, himself for 14 days. The Dutch MP Hans Molleman asked Dries Van Agt to ban the NVU twice; in 1976 and 1977. Since there was no proof about the NVU's role in the riots, Molleman's request was rejected.
