= Bloed, Bodem, Eer en Trouw =

Flemish neo-Nazi group

Bloed, Bodem, Eer en Trouw (BBET; "Blood, Soil, Honour and Loyalty") was a Flemish neo-Nazi group, created in 2004 from a splinter of the Flemish branch of the international Nazi skinhead organization Blood & Honour.

== History ==
The group rose to public prominence in September 2006, after 17 members, including 11 soldiers, were arrested under the December 2003 anti-terrorist laws and laws against racism, antisemitism and negationism. According to the prosecutor, the suspects were preparing terrorist attacks in order to "destabilize" Belgium.

150 police officers searched five military barracks in Leopoldsburg and Peer, in the Limburg province near the Dutch border, in the Brussels Royal Military School and in Zedelgem. Police also searched 18 private residences in Flanders. They found military weapons, ammunition, explosives, and a homemade bomb large enough to "blow up a car". Led by Thomas Boutens, the group trained itself in military foundations. It also trained in interrogation and counter-interrogation techniques, as well as in becoming clandestine.

The group was engaged in arms dealing, and one of the suspects worked in the Kleine Brogel military base where United States nuclear weapons are stocked. Thomas Boutens was developing international links, in particular with the Dutch far right movement National Alliance (NA). Several NA members, including party secretary Virginia Kapić, attended a BBET training camp. This led to her position in the party becoming untenable and she soon resigned from her post.

Flemish TV channel VTM claimed (citing justice sources) that the group was preparing to assassinate Filip Dewinter, an important figure of the far right Vlaams Belang party, in a false flag attack that would have been blamed on the Islamist movement. Taking advantage of the ensuing confusion, the group would then murder Dyab Abou Jahjah, leader of the Arab European League. Belgian justice authorise denied these claims.

The Belgian press recalled the "bloody eighties," during which the Brabant massacres were carried out (28 deaths), and the Marxist organization Communist Combatant Cells carried out terrorist attacks (2 deaths). Far right groups such as Westland New Post were suspected of being responsible for the Brabant massacres, although the parliamentary commission could not find any definitive proof. Journalist Manuel Abramowicz, a specialist of the far-right and founder of the progressive ResistanceS website and network, was quoted in Le Soir saying that radical right-wing ultras have always had an aim to "infiltrate the state mechanisms" — including the army in the 1970s and the 1980s, through Westland New Post and the Front de la Jeunesse.

== See also ==
- Blood & Honour
- Combat 18
- Racial Volunteer Force
- Strategy of tension
