= New National Party (Netherlands) =

New National Party Nieuwe Nationale Partij
- Chairman: Egbert Perée; Henk Ruitenberg; Florens van der Kooi
- Founded: 1998
- Dissolved: 2005
- Split from: Centre Party '86
- Headquarters: The Hague, Netherlands
- Newspaper: Barricade (magazine, 1999–2005)
- Youth wing: Nieuwe Nationale Jongeren (New National Youth)
- Membership: 200 (2000)
- Ideology: Nationalism
- Political position: Far-right
- Colours: Orange; Red; White; Blue

Website
- www.nnp.nu (defunct)

The New National Party (Dutch: Nieuwe Nationale Partij, abbr. NNP) was a Dutch nationalist political party which existed between 1998 and 2005. It succeeded the Volksnationalisten Nederland (abbr. VNN, People's Nationalists Netherlands) party which had been founded in 1997. The NNP was originally named Nationale Partij Nederland (abbr. NPN, National Party Netherlands) but because another party had used a similar name earlier the name was rejected by the Electoral Council (Dutch: Kiesraad).

Original logo of the NNP

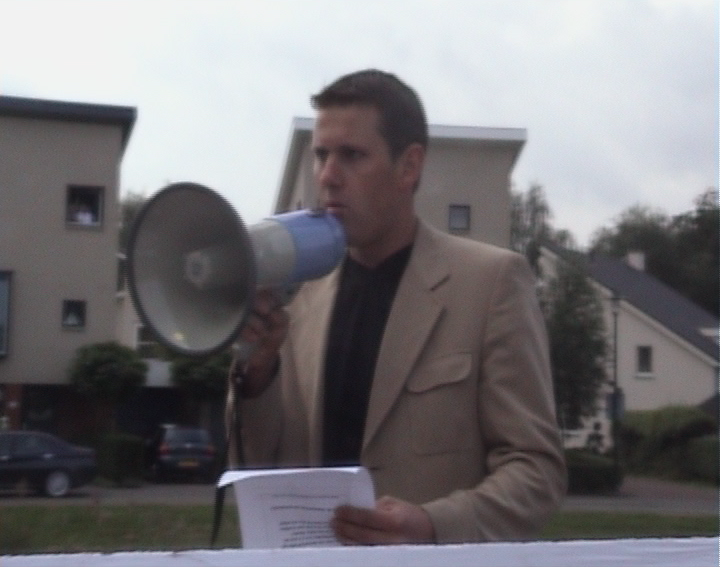
Florens van der Kooi, the last chairman of the NNP, during an NNP demonstration in Dordrecht in 2004

== History ==
The party, which succeeded the VNN and NPN, was first led by Egbert Perée, then by Henk Ruitenberg (ex-CP'86) and after him Florens van der Kooi. The party was considered to be successor of the Centre Party '86 (CP'86), which was banned by a Dutch court in 1998 as a "criminal organization".

The NNP was accused of racial hatred but never charged or convicted under the criminal code. The party claimed to stand for "protecting Dutch culture, language, sovereignty and identity for the further honour and glory and eternal existence of the entire Dutch tribe and nation". The party preferred remigration over integration and stood for whole-Netherlandism.

The NNP worked with New Right in the Actiecomité Stop MARTIJN which campaigned against the pedophiles of the Vereniging Martijn in 2003.

The driving forces behind the party in its early years were Marcel Hoogstra and Marc de Boer. The party mainly had members in North Brabant and Zeeland. In North Holland the regional wing of the party consisted of Wim Beaux (later chairman of the Nationalist People's Movement), Ton Steemers and Peter van Egmond and the regional wing of Zeeland was led by Wijnand de Putter.

Other board members included Hendrik Sybrandy and Gerard de Wit.

== Magazine ==
The party's magazine was called Barricade, which was published between 1999 and 2005. It was edited amongst others by Marcel Hoogstra, Jan Teijn, Alex Neid, Peter Beenke and Martijn Janssen.

== Youth wing ==
The youth wing of the party, the Nieuwe Nationale Jongeren was formed in 2002 and first led by Alex Neid. Since 2003, the youth wing was led by Geoffrey Robbemond, who also became secretary of the NNP, succeeding Paul Peters.

== Later developments ==
The party was dissolved in 2005 after many members left the party for newer parties, such as the conservative rightist New Right party and the largely national socialist National Alliance party.

Several former NNP members later became active for Voorpost, including Van der Kooi.
