= Joop Glimmerveen =

Dutch politician (1928–2022)

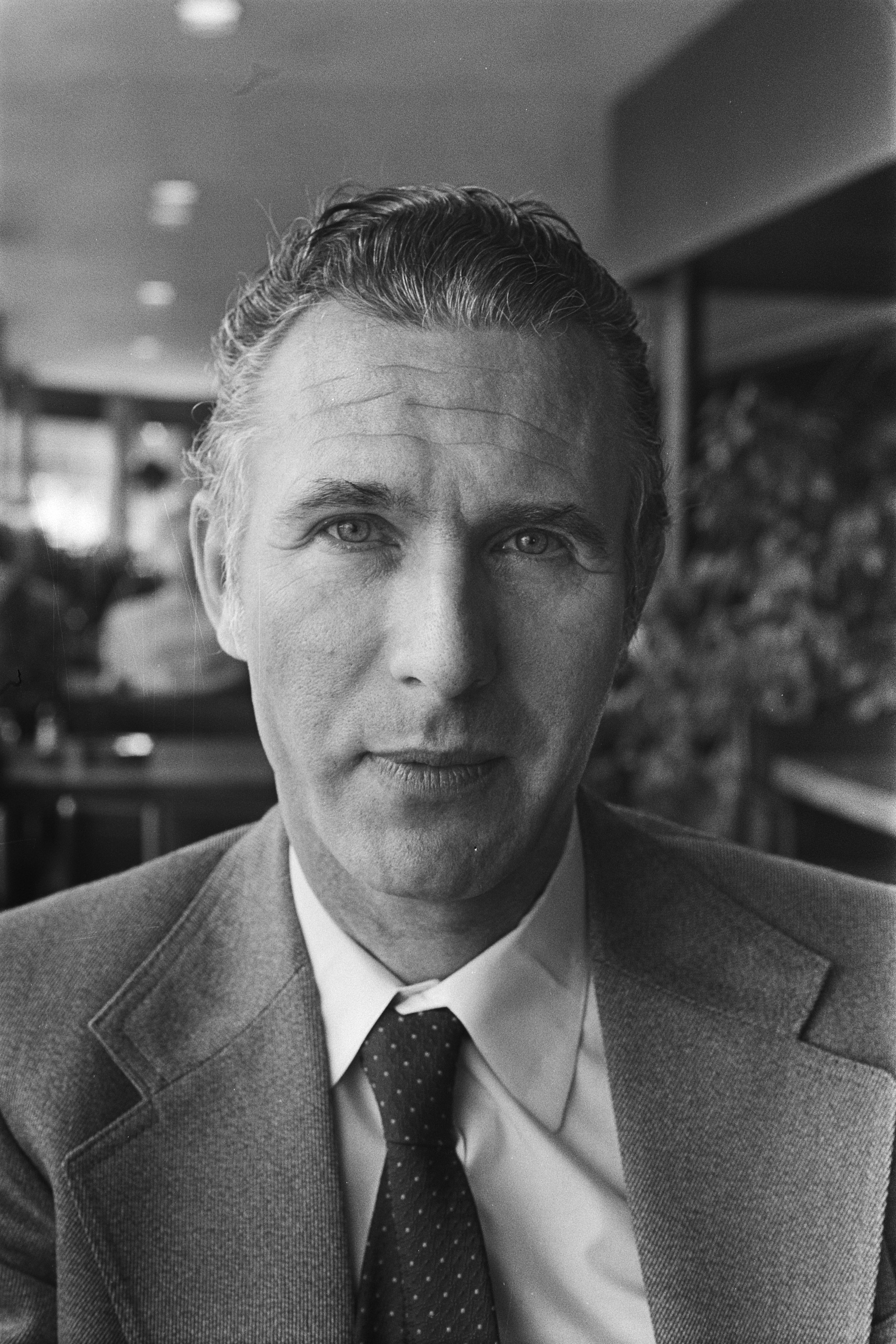
- Glimmerveen in 1977
- Born: Johann Georg Glimmerveen; 14 November 1928; Utrecht, Netherlands
- Died: 25 December 2022 (aged 94)
- Occupation: Politician
- Political party: Labour Party, Noordbond, Dutch People's Union

Johann Georg "Joop" Glimmerveen (14 November 1928 – 25 December 2022) was a Dutch far-right politician. He was active on the far-right from 1971.

== Early life ==
Born in Utrecht, Glimmerveen was educated in Hilversum and Amsterdam before starting work in 1945 in the salary office of the Calve-Delft company. In 1951 he joined the United Nations forces as a volunteer in the Korean War and following his service was employed at NATO's Supreme Headquarters Allied Powers Europe offices. He was dismissed from this position in 1974 after legal troubles relating to his political activity.

In 1949, Glimmerveen became a member of Nieuwe Koers, the youth movement of the Labour Party and he would eventually graduate to the full party, retaining his membership until 1962. By the time he left, his political views had shifted considerably to the right.

== Dutch People's Union ==
Glimmerveen first came to prominence as a member of the hardline Noordbond, a neo-Nazi group with links to the likes of Colin Jordan in the United Kingdom. From there he joined the Dutch People's Union (NVU) in 1971 not long after its foundation. He became the new group's propaganda chief and sought to make inroads in Rotterdam following a series of race riots in the city. In 1974 he was a candidate for the party in The Hague and ran a high-profile campaign against immigration from the Dutch West Indies to the city. With this campaign he captured 4000 votes, just missing a seat on the council and was chosen as leader of the NVU later in the year. Bernard Postma, NVU leader at the time, had actually been opposed to contesting the election and Glimmerveen was the only candidate but his success in getting his way over the election was part of a power shift away from Postma and to Glimmerveen. Postma stood down as leader in October 1974 with Glimmerveen replacing him.

Under his leadership the group became more Nazi in appearance and ideology, with Glimmerveen adopting the title of 'leader' and the group holding up collaborators such as Anton Mussert and Meinoud Rost van Tonningen as inspirations. Eventually, Glimmerveen praised Adolf Hitler for his skill as a leader. He spent fourteen days in prison in August 1976 for praising Hitler in the NVU journal Wij Nederland. Other party activists were frequently imprisoned at this time for distributing leaflets that were held to be inciting riots.

Although the party initially looked poised to make a breakthrough their comparatively high-profile was not to last. A series of damaging court cases and attempts to ban the party saw their fortunes fade dramatically and Glimmerveen resigned as leader in 1981. Indeed, the party had even been forced to sit out the 1978 municipal elections after being banned by the courts due to Glimmerveen's activities. A more conservative faction took control of the group for a while and Glimmerveen briefly set up his own group Jongers Front Nederland. He returned to the NVU in 1983 to again take a central role in the organisation. During an interview, Glimmerveen remarked that all Surinamese in the Netherlands should go back to Suriname, a former Dutch colony in South America, and all Jews must go to Israel. In response, he was arrested and sentenced to six weeks in prison for making racist and anti-Semitic remarks.

== Subsequent activity and death ==
Glimmerveen retired not long afterwards although by the 1990s he was convinced to return again to the NVU by its then leaders. He helped the group build links with Belgian and German neo-Nazi groups, although he fell out with the leadership and again quit the NVU in 2000.

Glimmerveen was convicted in 2003 of making pro-Nazi speeches at a CP'86 rally seven years earlier and was sentenced to four months in prison. In 2007, Glimmerveen was one of a number of Dutch extremists fined in Belgium for making the Nazi salute.

Glimmerveen died on 25 December 2022, at the age of 94.
