= Constant Kusters =

Dutch politician

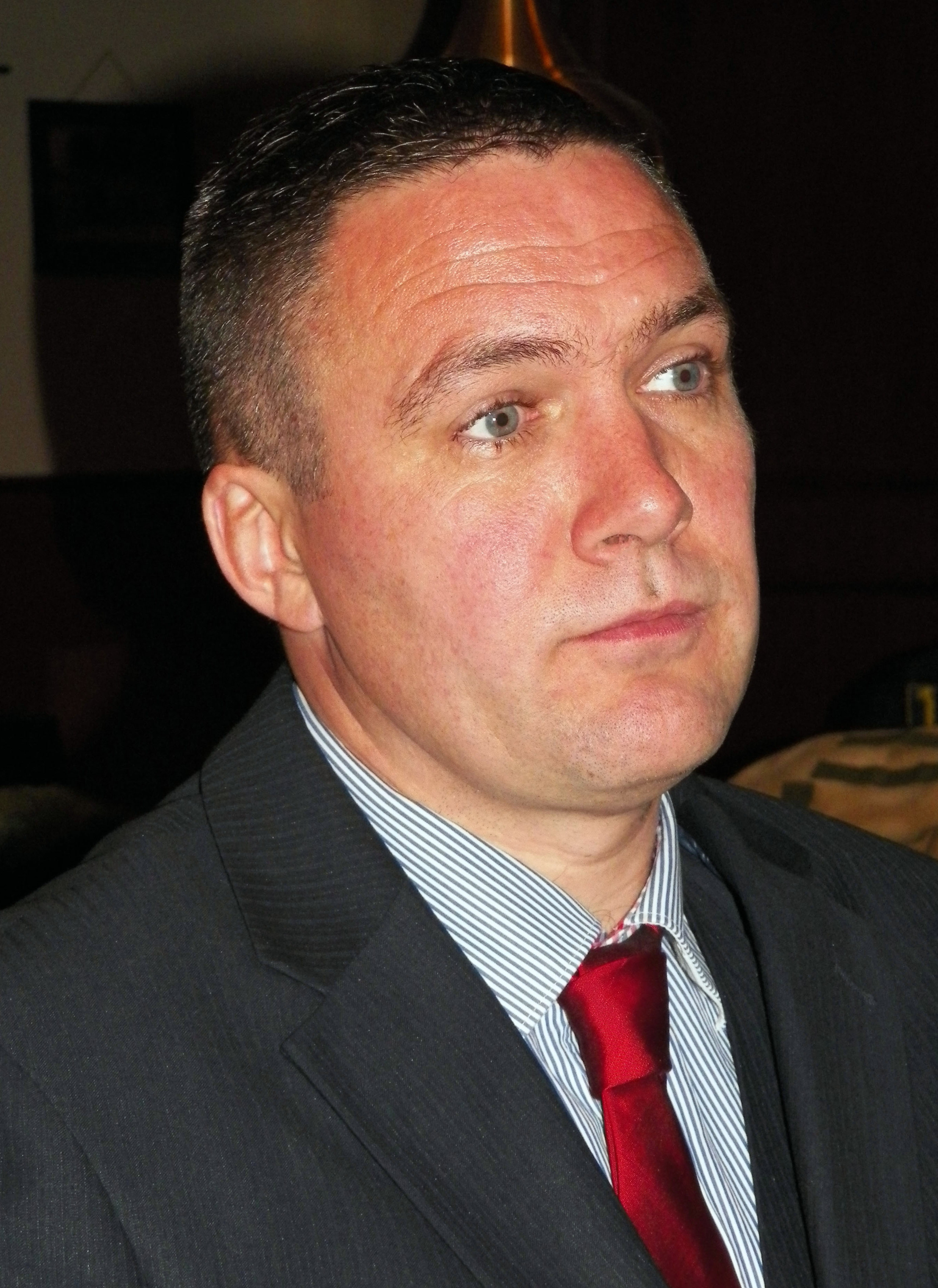
- Kusters in 2012
- Born: 1970 (age 55–56)

Constant Kusters (born 12 December 1970 in Oosterbeek) is a Dutch politician. He is chairman of the Dutch People's Union (NVU). This party is mainly known for its Neo-Nazi beliefs. Kusters has been convicted of various offenses relating to racial hatred on several occasions.

Following a commemoration for Rudolf Hess on August 26, 2000, Kusters and two other Dutch neo-Nazis were prosecuted for inciting racial hatred due to the distribution of an NVU pamphlet. This distribution included text boards, banners, and flags featuring Neo-Nazi texts and slogans. Kusters was found guilty and sentenced to six weeks in prison.
