= Dutch People's Union =

Neo-Nazi political party in the Netherlands

Dutch People's Union Nederlandse Volks-Unie
- Abbreviation: NVU
- Chairman: Constant Kusters
- Secretary: Peter van Egmond
- Founder: Guus Looy
- Founded: 27 May 1971; 55 years ago
- Headquarters: Willem Beijerstraat 17, Arnhem, Netherlands
- Newspaper: Wij Europa; Wij Nederland (formerly)
- Youth wing: Netherlands Germanic Youth (Germaanse Jeugd Nederland, GJN)
- Membership (2013): c. 20
- Ideology: Neo-Nazism; Ethnic nationalism Dutch irredentism
- Political position: Far-right
- House of Representatives: 0 / 150
- Provincial councils: 0 / 572
- Municipal councils: 0 / 8,863

Website
- nvu.nu

The Dutch People's Union (Dutch: Nederlandse Volks-Unie, Dutch pronunciation: [ˈneːdərlɑntsə ˈvɔl(ə)ksˌyni], NVU) is a Dutch far-right political party. The party espouses ethnic nationalism, advocates for the preservation of "Germanic Christian culture" in the Netherlands, and is a proponent of a Greater Netherlands.

According to the General Intelligence and Security Service, the NVU attracts traditional antisemitic neo-Nazis and aims to establish a one-party state in the Netherlands, in imitation of the Nazi Party. In the 2000s, the party was said to organize almost all right-wing extremist public demonstrations in the country.

== History ==
=== Founding years (1971–1973) ===
The Dutch People's Union (NVU) was founded as a political party on 27 May 1971 by Guus Looy, with as key purpose to rehabilitate convicted war criminals of World War II in the Netherlands. In 1973, the Belgian Roeland Raes, vice chairman of the Flemish secessionist political party Vlaams Blok, also became vice chairman of the NVU—reflecting the desire of both parties to unify the Dutch and Flemish political scenes.

=== Glimmerveen's first chairmanship (1974–1981) ===
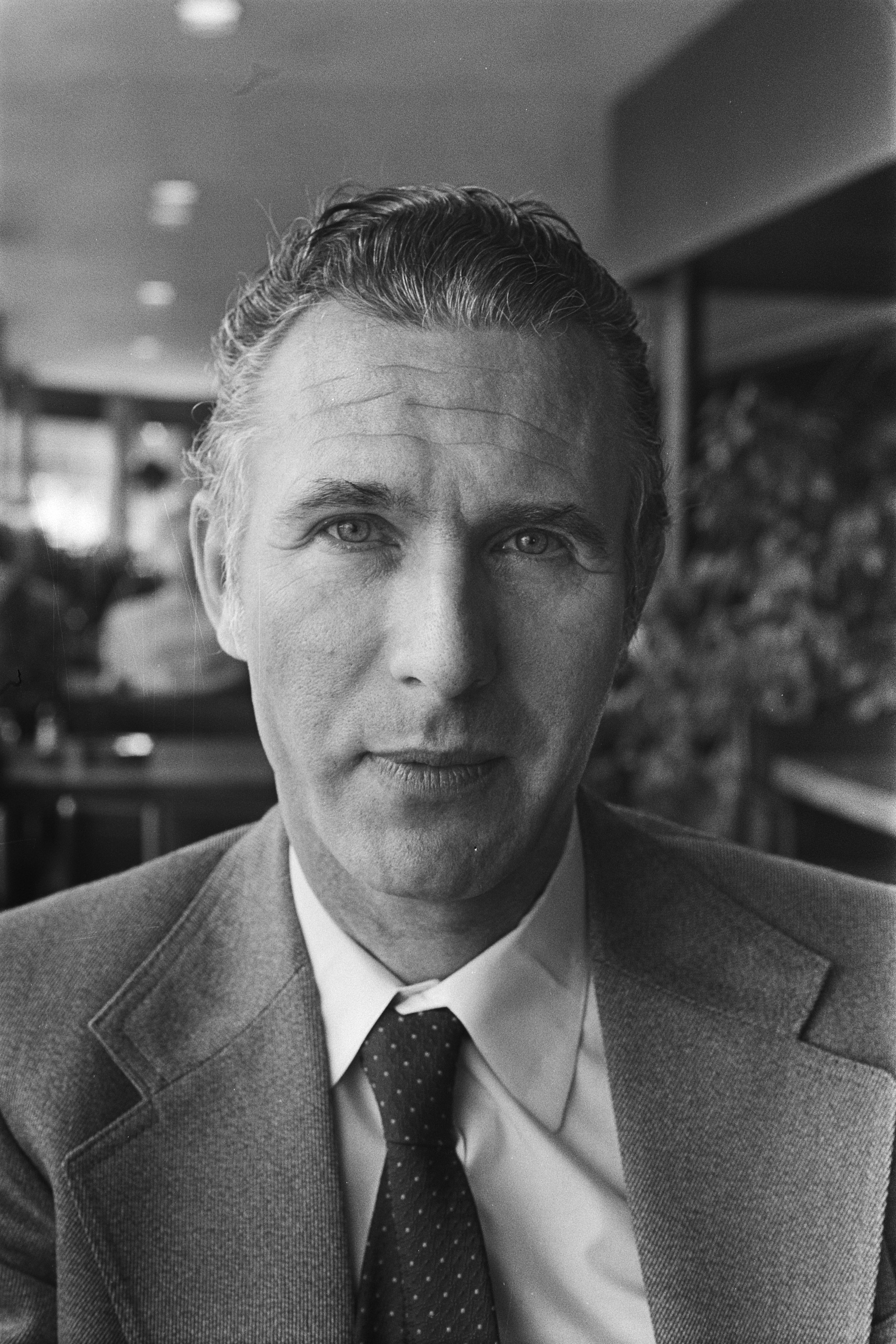
Joop Glimmerveen in 1977

In 1974, Joop Glimmerveen, a former Labour Party member, joined the NVU and the party began agitating against the growing presence of migrant workers and Surinamese people in the Netherlands. With the backing of the party, Glimmerveen participated in the 1974 municipal council election in The Hague, using the slogan "The Hague must remain white and safe!" In the end, he was several hundred votes short of a seat. Later that year, Glimmerveen became chairman of the NVU.

According to a 1975 report from the Domestic Security Service, representatives of the NVU, including Glimmerveen, had been in talks with the Surinamese R.R. Nunes, who was said to be in contact with controversial Dutch military officer Raymond Westerling and who was alleged to have plans to form a mercenary army to seize power in Suriname. Glimmerveen had refused to work with the Surinamese G.A. Baker, who had also wanted to raise a mercenary army in which Glimmerveen, a veteran of the Korean War, had been offered to work as an instructor.

In 1976, the NVU distributed an inflammatory pamphlet during street brawls between locals and immigrants in Schiedam. In 1977, the party organized a demonstration in Soestduinen, in which a number of neo-fascists and former members of the wartime National Socialist Movement in the Netherlands participated. Afterwards, several people were convicted for the content of their speeches.

Attempts by the Ministry of Justice to ban the NVU culminated with a court order in 1978. Owing to a controversial decision to forbid but not actually dissolve the party, the NVU was able to continue its activities after the ban. Party confidence had plummeted, however, and in 1980 several members split to form the Centre Party—which itself would splinter again into the Centre Democrats (CD) and the Centre Party '86 (CP'86)—and the NVU found itself in a competitive struggle.

After a disappointing performance in the 1981 general election, Glimmerveen stepped down as chairman. The party tried to organize partnerships and mergers with other far-right parties, but these initiatives proved unfruitful.

=== Glimmerveen's second chairmanship (1983–1987) ===
In 1983, Glimmerveen returned as chairman. A large number of street actions and demonstrations were organized in cooperation with the far-right youth organization Netherlands Youth Front (Dutch: Jongeren Front Nederland, JFN). For example, a counter-demonstration was held at the 1983 anti-nuclear weapons demonstration in The Hague. From 1984, the NVU also increasingly associated itself with Nazi Germany and wartime figures like Hitler's deputy Rudolf Hess (incarcerated at Spandau Prison until his death in 1987) and Dutch Nazi collaborator Anton Mussert.

In 1987, Glimmerveen again stepped down as chairman and the party became inactive. The NVU was no longer viable as it had been outcompeted by the CD and CP'86, and it lacked members and funds.

=== Revival and Glimmerveen's third chairmanship (1996–2001) ===
In 1996, young neo-Nazis Constant Kusters and Eite Homan (both of whom had ties with the American NSDAP/AO) approached Glimmerveen with the request to revive the party. This second iteration of the NVU hosted transnational events in which neo-Nazis from Belgium and Germany participated and the party competed in The Hague and Arnhem during the 1998 Dutch municipal elections, though it again failed to win representation.

During this period, the NVU mainly functioned as the political arm of Homan's Aktiefront Nationale Socialisten (ANS). This was a small group of Autonomous Nationalist activists inspired by the former Action Front of National Socialists/National Activists in West Germany, and which claimed solidarity with the Palestinians in the Israeli–Palestinian conflict and with other groups they considered to be anti-imperialist.

=== Kusters' chairmanship (since 2001) ===
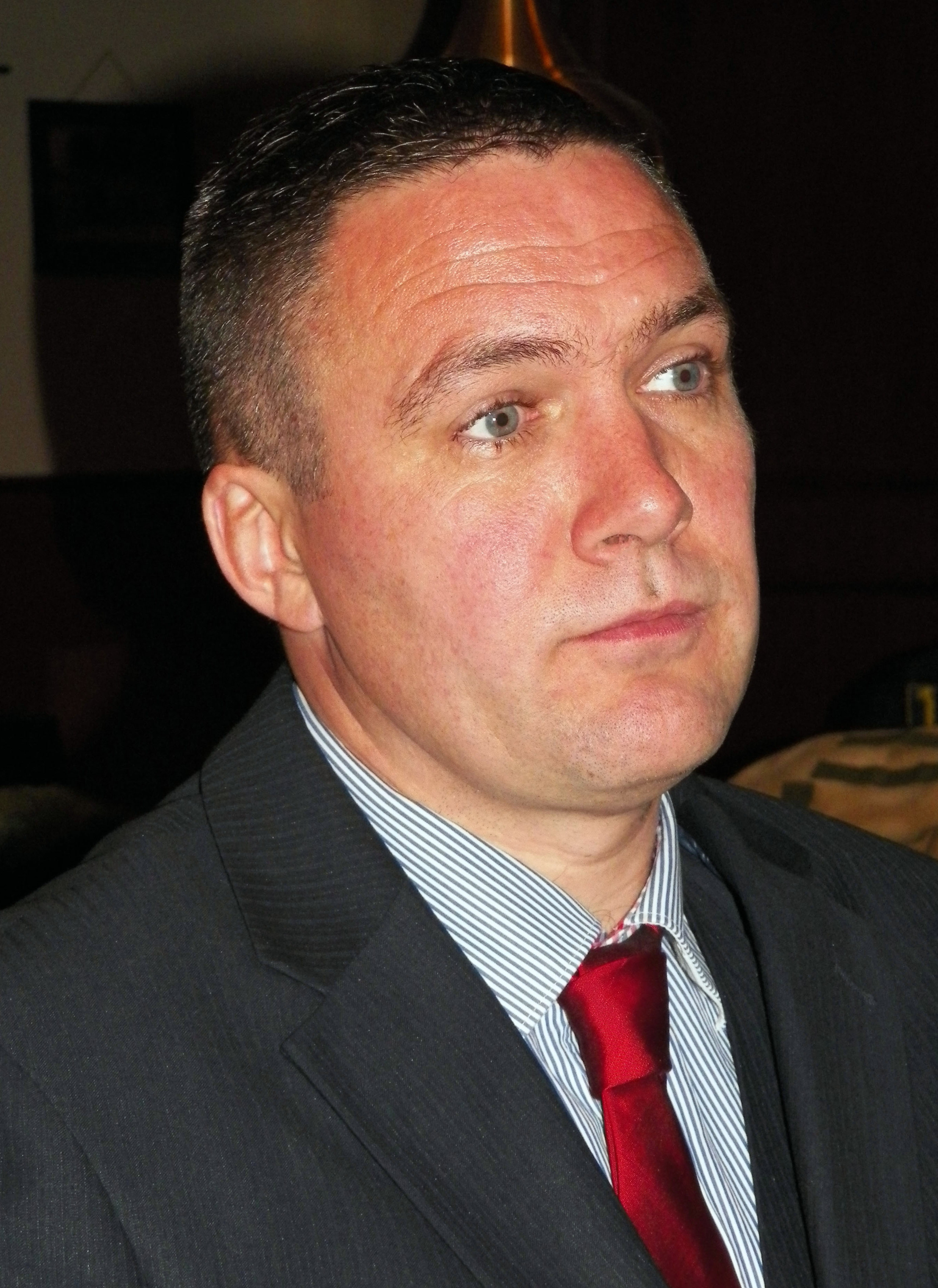
Constant Kusters in 2012

In 2001, Constant Kusters became party chairman and set out to moderate the NVU's appearance. In the same year, Glimmerveen left the party on bad terms, followed by other prominent members such as Eite Homan and "Hitler imitator" Stefan Wijkamp. Glimmerveen became one of Kusters' biggest critics when he publicly aired the NVU's dirty laundry in 2003 and even threatened Kusters with legal action unless he quietly left the party. Nonetheless, the NVU was the most active far-right party in the Netherlands throughout the 2000s. During street actions it was supported by a Dutch chapter of the British neo-Nazi group Racial Volunteer Force (RVF).

In 2015, the NVU attracted media attention when supporters of the party appeared in various municipalities on consultation evenings about the arrival of processing facilities for asylum seekers in the context of the European migrant crisis.

The party has claimed close cooperation with the right-wing populist Forum for Democracy (Forum voor Democratie, FvD). These claims were substantiated by, among other things, screenshots of bank statements of payments by the FvD to the NVU to rent a venue for a party meeting with FvD prominents Thierry Baudet and Theo Hiddema, and logs of Facebook Messenger conversations and email traffic between the FvD and NVU. Baudet has denied this collaboration, but did expel an FvD member who was also active for the NVU.

== Criticism ==
One of the biggest critics of NVU leader Constant Kusters was Joop Glimmerveen, who had been the face and leader of the party since the early 1970s and its ideologue until the end of the 1990s. In 1996, after almost 11 years of inactivity, Glimmerveen handed the NVU over to Kusters and Eite Homan.

Glimmerveen had given up party membership in 1994 but remained in control of the editorial rights of the party newspaper Wij Nederland. Kusters writes and edits the current party newspaper Wij Europa, which Glimmerveen could not stand for both its ideological course and its "shoddy production".

In 2003, Glimmerveen published a special edition of Wij Nederland, subtitled De handel en wandel van NVU-clown Kusters (English: The Conduct of NVU Clown Kusters), filled with letters to Kusters, the latter's responses, and Glimmerveen's own vision for the NVU. Among other things, Glimmerveen accused Kusters of embezzling party funds to "supplement his meagre unemployment". He also threatened Kusters with court action if he did not sort out the financial management of the NVU.

=== Abvakabo ban ===
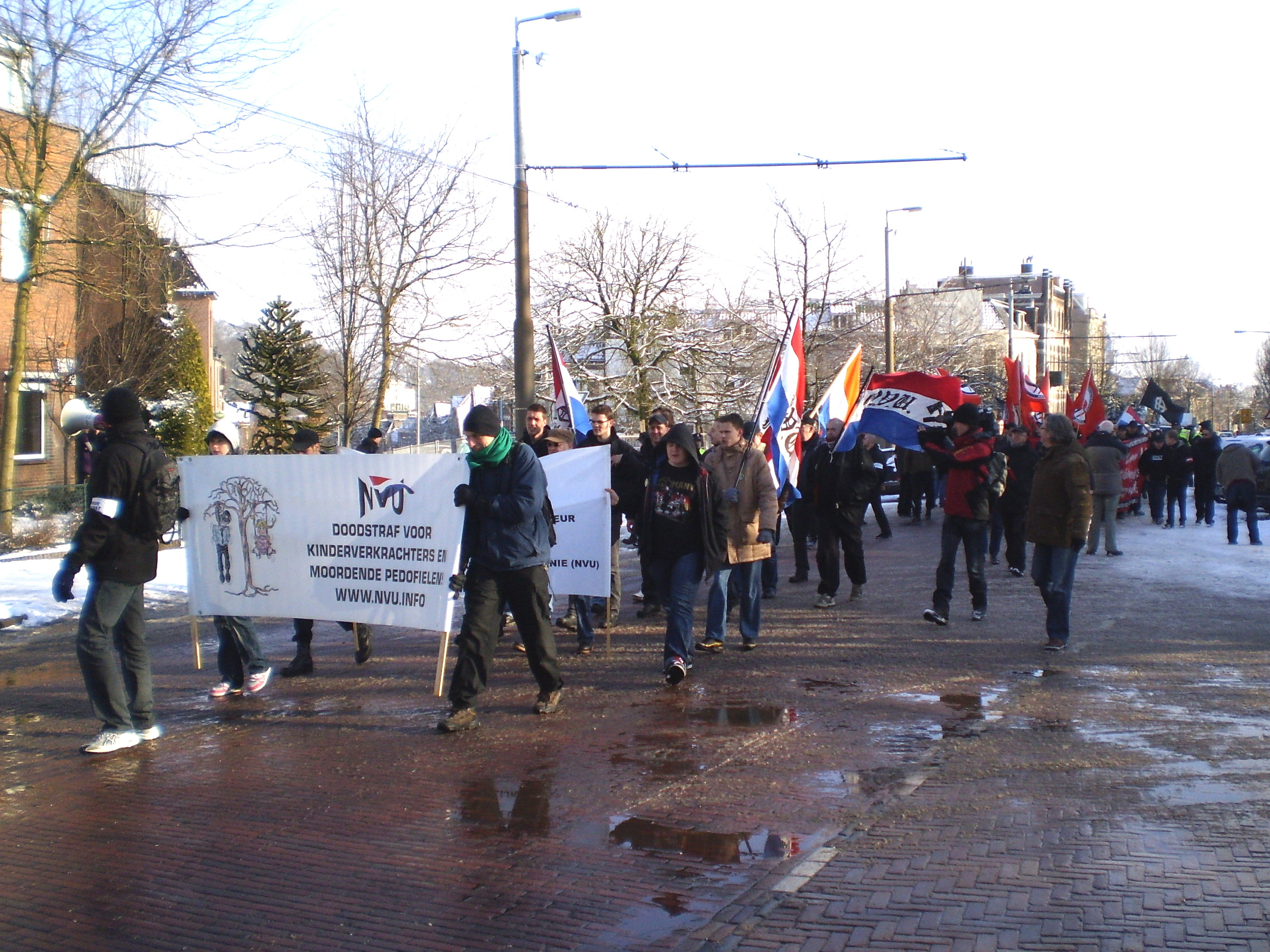
A 2010 demonstration in Arnhem, propagating the "death penalty for child rapists and murderous pedophiles"

In a combined effort with the Anne Frank Foundation, the former trade union Abvakabo forbade its members from being affiliated with organizations such as the NVU, ANS, and RVF. Other affiliations it proscribed were those of the ethnonationalist Voorpost and Netherlands National Youth (Dutch: Nationale Jeugd Nederland, NJN), the Dutch chapter of the British neo-Nazi group Blood & Honour, the Turkish ultranationalist Grey Wolves, and the NVU/CP'86 splinter group Association for Dutch Nationalists (Dutch: Vereniging voor Nederlandse Nationalisten, VNN). In 2012, the Dutch Equal Treatment Commission ruled that barring members of the NVU and Voorpost from other memberships is prohibited discrimination on the basis of political affiliation.

== Election results ==
The Dutch People's Union participated eight times in municipal council elections in different cities between 1974 and 2022. In none of these elections did party members gain enough votes for a seat on the council. The NVU also participated in the provincial council election for Gelderland in 2003 and 2007, but here too did not receive enough votes for a seat on the council. In 1977, 1981, and 1982, the party participated in the general election for the House of Representatives, but was unable to secure parliamentary representation.

House of Representatives	1977	1981	1982
Nederlandse Volks-Unie (NVU)	0.4%	0.1%	0.0%

Provincial council	2003	2007
Gelderland	0.15%	0.27%

Municipal council	1974	1982	1986	1998	2002	2006	2010	2022
Apeldoorn	–	–	–	–	–	1.0%	–	–
Arnhem	–	–	–	0.0%*	0.7%	0.7%	0.7%	0.3%
The Hague	1.8%	1.1%*	0.2%	0.0%*	–	–	–	–
Heerlen	–	–	–	–	–	–	0.6%	–
Kerkrade	–	–	–	–	0.8%	–	–	–
Landgraaf	–	–	–	–	0.75%	–	–	–
Nijmegen	–	–	–	–	–	0.6%	0.5%	–
Oss	–	–	–	–	–	1.0%	–	–
Rotterdam	–	–	–	–	0.1%	–	–	–
Venray	–	–	–	–	–	0.4%	–	–

* Party was listed as Lijst Glimmerveen
