= Centre Party '86 =

Dutch far-right political party

Centre Party '86 Centrumpartij '86
- Chairman: Wim Wijngaarden (1986–1994); Henk Ruitenberg (1994–1998)
- Founded: 20 May 1986
- Banned: 18 November 1998
- Ideology: Ethnic nationalism Ultranationalism
- Political position: Far-right
- Colours: Blue
- Slogan: Eigen Volk Eerst (Our People First)

The Centre Party '86 (Dutch: Centrumpartij '86; abbr. CP’86), briefly known as the National People's Party/CP'86 (Nationale Volkspartij/CP’86) was a Dutch far-right political party with a populist nationalist orientation that existed between 1986 and 1998. The party claimed to represent the interests of indigenous Dutch society. The CP'86 acted as a kind of successor and continuation of the Centre Party. The party was established on 20 May 1986 and dissolved on 18 November 1998 after an Amsterdam court ruling made the party illegal.

== History ==
=== Foundation ===
The Centre Party, the precursor to the 1986 version, fell apart in 1986, right before the 1986 general election. Therefore, Wim Wijngaarden and D.H.M. (Danny) Segers launched a so-called "restart" under the name CP'86 (center party 1986).Wijngaarden became chairman and after long deliberation, a text of the NPD was selected as the party manifesto. In 1994, Wijngaarden was succeeded by Henk Ruitenberg for health reasons.

The new name did not help, nor did the designation of the new party as "national-democratic" and later "populist-nationalist", instead of the former "centrist-democratic". In its early years, the CP'86 did not do well. There were many internal disputes and the opposing Centre Democrats (CD) proved to be stronger than expected. In the 1987 provincial elections, the seat in Flevoland, which had been held by Wim Beaux for the Centre Party since the autumn of 1985, was lost. Neither CP'86 nor CD managed to win a seat in any of the provinces. The CP'86 did not participate in the 1989 general elections, which incidentally, led to the re-entry of Hans Janmaat into parliament, this time on behalf of the CD.

=== Radicalization ===
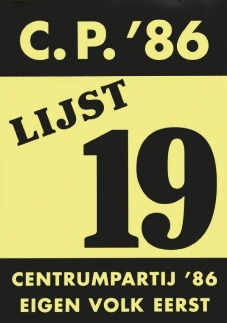
1994 election poster

On 21 March 1990, municipal council elections were held in which CP'86 won 11 seats in five municipalities, 4 of which the old CP had occupied seats in 1986. That year, a large group of young people from the banned Youth Front Netherlands (JFN) under their former chairman, Stewart Mordaunt had joined up with CP'86. Since then, the party has used the Celtic cross as an emblem. Mordaunt himself was then elected in March, to the municipal council of The Hague. This group grew the party to something larger and more active, while further radicalizing the party. Under the energetic leadership of Henk Ruitenberg in 1993, assisted by Tim Mudde from the JFN, the party went through a revival period.

From May 1992 to May 1996, Tim Mudde, as party secretary, put his political street activism into practice. During the 1994 municipal elections, the CP'86 won nine seats in seven municipal councils. However, the party never won seats in the House of Representatives, despite getting close in 1994. Despite their successes in activism, their number of council seats began to decline after the mid-90s as a result of economic development and competition from the CD. The party was reformed at the end of 1994 and renamed National People's Party / CP'86 to distinguish itself with its radical character, a name that mostly went unused.

=== Decline ===
The Ministry of Justice had been watching the party for some time. As part of a judicial investigation, the party leadership underwent house searches. After these searches it took considerable effort for the party organisation to be re-established. On 2 May 1995, CP'86 and its board were convicted under Article 137 and Article 140 of the Wetboek van Strafrecht (Dutch Penal Code) for crimes committed between 1992 and 1994, an appeal was denied in December 1995. Afterwards, the CP'86 party leadership, then headed by Martijn Freling, made racist statements in a public party meeting in 1995, leading to the Public Prosecution Service to initiate classification of the party as a criminal organization and initiate its banning procedure.

Major disagreements about the party's image led to mass expulsions. From November 1996 to February 1997, two CP'86 boards emerged, one under Mordaunt and the other under the anti-Freling Beaux. The latter, wanting a new 'clean' image, started a new party in 1997 under the name Volksnationalisten Nederland (VNN) with Beaux, and later Henk Ruitenberg, as president. VNN tried to make use of publicity stunts and took part in Rotterdam council elections, albeit with ultimately disappointing results. The VNN merged with the newly established New National Party (NNP) in 1998.

Meanwhile, the Public Prosecution Service was looking to determine that CP'86 was not a political party, but a criminal organization under law. On 30 September 1997, the Supreme Court convicted the then central administration and former chairman Wijngaarden together with the party as a criminal organization for systematical incitement of xenophobia, which ended CP'86.

As a result, the party was banned under orders of Minister of Justice Benk Korthals in 1998. On 30 September 1997 the Amsterdam court ruled that the party was a criminal organization and ordered its dissolution, citing the party's incitement of xenophobia. Prior to the verdict, the party had long since become an empty shell and Chairman Frelin decided not to appeal the verdict. The party was thus dissolved, but its legacy lived on with the New National Party, established on 3 July 1998.

== Electoral performance ==
Year	Election	Lead candidate	List	Votes		Seats	Ref.
Year	Election	Lead candidate	List	No.	%	No.	
1986	General elections	Danny Segers	—	36,741	0,36	0 / 150	
1987	Provincial elections	—	—	1,032	0,01	0	
1990	Local elections	—	—			4 seats in total, 2 seats in Amsterdam and 2 in Rotterdam	
1991	Provincial elections	—	—	17,371	0,30		
1994	General elections	Wim Beaux	List	32,327	0,40	0 / 150	
1994	Local elections			36,445	0,48		
1995	Provincial elections			7,789	0,14		
1998	Local elections			4,354	0,06		
