= Raymond Belmont =

Raymond Belmont may refer to:

- Raymond Rodgers Belmont (1863–1887), American polo player
- Raymond Belmont II (1888–1934), his nephew, American polo player
