= Raymond Belmont II =

American polo player

Raymond Belmont II (May 31, 1888 – April 5, 1934) was a champion polo player.

== Early life ==
Belmont was born on May 31, 1888, in Nassau County, New York. He was one of three sons born to financier August Belmont Jr. (1853–1924) and, his first wife, Elizabeth "Bessie" Hamilton (née Morgan) Belmont (1862–1898). Among his siblings was August Belmont III and Morgan Belmont. After his mother's death in 1898, his father remarried to the English born actress, Eleanor Robson.

Belmont graduated from Harvard University in 1910.

== Career ==
After graduation from Harvard, he became a clerk in the office of August Belmont & Co., the banking house founded by his grandfather August Belmont. In 1916, Belmont attended the Citizens' Military Training Camp in Plattsburgh, New York, before shipping off to France in May 1918 as a lieutenant in the Headquarters Troop of the 78th Division. He was promoted to captain in the St. Mihiel advance.

=== Polo career ===
Belmont was a champion polo player, with a six-goal handicap, in 1923, and was a member of the team (along with Devereux Milburn, Thomas Hitchcock Jr., and Robert Early Strawbridge Jr.) that won the National Open Championship from the British Army four. He was also a horse breeder and one of the best known gentleman riders in the county. His horse, Oracle, twice won the Maryland Hunt Club.

== Personal life ==
Belmont was married three times. His first marriage was in 1912 to Ethel Helen Linder, who was known by her stage name, Ethel Lorraine. They divorced in 1916 and his second marriage took place on September 20, 1916, he was married to Carolyn Brown Hulbert (1892–1970) in Middleburg, Virginia. Before their divorce, they were the parents of one daughter:

- Elizabeth Hurlbert "Bettina" Belmont (1919–1993), who married Newell Jube "Buddy" Ward Jr. in 1939. Ward, a gentleman-farmer, was a great-grandson of the founder of Prudential Insurance.

Raymond and Carolyn divorced in Reno in August 1926 and she remarried to Arthur John White, with whom she had a son, Arthur Ridgely White. In September 1926, Belmont married Mrs. Marie Muurling Maddux.

After an illness of several days, Belmont died of pneumonia at his home, known as Belray in Middleburg, near Leesburg, Virginia, on April 5, 1934.
