= Charles Blackader =

British Army general

Major-General Charles Blackader CB DSO
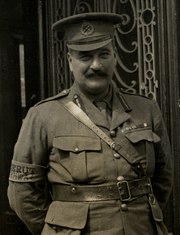
- Blackader as a brigadier-general in July 1915
- Born: 20 September 1869; Richmond, Surrey, England
- Died: 2 April 1921 (aged 51); Millbank, City of Westminster, England
- Military career
- Allegiance: United Kingdom
- Branch: British Army
- Service years: 1888–1921
- Rank: Major-General
- Unit: Leicestershire Regiment
- Commands: Southern District, Irish Command; 38th (Welsh) Division; 177th Brigade; 20th (Garhwal) Brigade; 2nd Battalion, Leicestershire Regiment
- Conflicts: Second Boer War; First World War
- Awards: Companion of the Order of the Bath; Distinguished Service Order; Mentioned in Despatches; Commander of the Order of Leopold (Belgium); Croix de Guerre (Belgium); Croix de Guerre (France)

Major-General Charles Guinand Blackader, CB, DSO (20 September 1869 – 2 April 1921) was a British Army officer of the First World War. He commanded an Indian brigade on the Western Front in 1915, and a Territorial brigade in Dublin during the Easter Rising of 1916, before being appointed to command the 38th (Welsh) Division on the Western Front, a position he held until retiring due to ill-health in May 1918.

Originally joining the army in 1888 as a junior officer in the Leicestershire Regiment, Blackader's first active posting was in the late 1890s, when he served on attachment to the West African Frontier Force, closely followed by service during the Second Boer War, where he commanded a company at the defence of Ladysmith. An efficient and well-regarded administrator, he commanded a series of detached stations in addition to his regimental duties for the next ten years, eventually rising to take command of the 2nd Battalion, Leicestershire Regiment, in 1912. On the outbreak of the First World War, he commanded his battalion on the Western Front as part of an Indian Army formation; when his superior officer was promoted in early 1915, Blackader succeeded him as commander of the brigade, and led it through the Battle of Neuve Chapelle and the Battle of Loos.

After the Indian Army was withdrawn from France, Blackader was posted to a second-line Territorial Force brigade training in the United Kingdom. In 1916, it was sent to Dublin during the Easter Rising; following the Rising, Blackader presided over a number of the resulting courts-martial, including those of several of the signatories to the Proclamation of the Irish Republic. Later that year, he was ordered to France to take over command of the 38th (Welsh) Division, a New Army formation which had suffered heavy losses in the Battle of the Somme. He remained with the division for almost two years, helping retrain and reorganise it as an efficient fighting unit. The division would see significant successes in the Hundred Days Offensive of late 1918, but by this point Blackader was no longer in command; he had been invalided home earlier in the year. He died shortly after the war, in 1921, aged 51.

== Early life ==
Charles Guinand Blackader was born in Richmond, Surrey (now part of London) on 20 September 1869. His father, Charles George Blackader, was a teacher to a small number of boarding pupils; he had come from an Army family, and taught at Cheltenham College and Clifton College, Bristol, before moving to private tuition. His mother, Charlotte Guinand, was born in Germany; her family may have come from Alsace-Lorraine, as Blackader would later proudly describe himself as half-French. During his childhood, the Blackaders moved from Richmond to Southampton, where his father headed the education department at the Hartley Institute, and then to Boulogne in France, where he taught at Beaurepaire School.

Returning from France in 1887, Blackader studied at the Royal Military College, Sandhurst, where he was regarded as a generally promising pupil; his marks were highest in administrative and academic subjects, but lower in drawing and physical education. He left Sandhurst in August 1888, and joined the 1st Battalion, Leicestershire Regiment (later the Royal Leicestershire Regiment), as a second lieutenant. The battalion sailed for a posting in Bermuda two weeks after his arrival; his departure was delayed, however, by remaining in London to marry. The ceremony took place on 2 October, at a registry office in Marylebone, and his biographer notes that it was "clearly in haste" – their first child was born six and a half months after the wedding. Such an early wedding was very unusual for a junior officer at this period; on average, army officers did not marry until their mid-thirties.

Blackader and his wife spent a year and a half in Bermuda, where their daughter Dorothy was born in April 1889, and moved to Nova Scotia in Canada when the battalion was transferred there in 1890; shortly after arrival, on 21 March, he was promoted to lieutenant on 21 March. Their second daughter Joan was born in April 1892, and a year later the battalion transferred again, this time to the West Indies; Blackader was appointed adjutant – the officer responsible for administration – to one wing of the battalion, a force of three companies stationed at Jamaica. In late 1895, the battalion moved to South Africa, but shortly after arrival Blackader returned to England; he was promoted to captain on 6 December.

== West Africa and the Boer War ==
In late 1897, Blackader was seconded for service in West Africa, as one of the officers recruited by Frederick Lugard for the newly raised West African Frontier Force. Blackader was attached to the 1st Battalion, under Thomas Pilcher, who described him as always "cheery and anxious to do his work"; he threw himself fully into the organisation of the force, and within six months of his arrival the battalion was able to be deployed successfully on operations against local slave-traders. This was Blackader's first active service, and saw his first mention in despatches; it also saw an early appearance of his skill for administration and management, which would mark much of his later career.

He left West Africa in January 1899, after a successful posting, but in ill-health; a third of the officers sent with him had died while on secondment, and Blackader had contracted malaria as well as suffering an attack of dysentery. He spent six months on leave to recover, and then sailed to take command of a company of the 1st Leicesters, still stationed in South Africa.

Blackader joined his company in Natal in early October 1899. It saw action with the battalion within a few days of the outbreak of the Second Boer War, at the Battle of Talana Hill on 20 October, and again at the Battle of Ladysmith on the 30th. Boer forces surrounded Ladysmith after the battle, and began a four-month siege.

The battalion remained in the town, with the monotony broken by an occasional skirmish with the besiegers, until the relief column arrived at the end of February. Following the advance into Natal, they were stationed in Middelburg in October, for a second prolonged period of garrison duty broken by occasional raids in the Transvaal. The battalion's area of responsibility was extended in April 1901 to take in Witbank, and Blackader was appointed commandant of the railway station and its associated collieries, with over 1,500 staff.

Following the battalion's move up the railway line in July, Blackader was transferred to a new post at Balmoral; as well as the railway station, he was made responsible for a civilian concentration camp outside the town. These camps were frequently crowded, unhealthy, and badly supplied; few reports have survived on the Balmoral camp, however, and it is not clear how efficient or otherwise Blackader's administration was.

Blackader had applied for a home posting in December 1900, as adjutant to a battalion of volunteers; this had been approved in August 1901, subject to his being released from duties in South Africa. However, the transfer was delayed, and he did not leave for home until June 1902, when he sailed on board the SS Bavarian with troops returning for the Coronation of Edward VII. He had been twice mentioned in despatches during the war, received the Queen's South Africa Medal, and was awarded the Distinguished Service Order (DSO).

== Home service and India ==
In August 1902, Blackader took up his appointment as adjutant of the 1st Volunteer Battalion, Leicestershire Regiment, where he would spend the next two years. This was primarily an administrative post – he was the senior regular officer attached to the battalion, and responsible for its organisation and training. At the end of his tenure he was promoted to major in September 1904, and left for India a few months later to join the regular 1st Battalion. Shortly after his arrival, he was appointed to command the cantonment at the Purandhar Sanatorium, his fourth administrative posting in five years. He returned to England with the battalion at the end of 1906, when it moved into camp at Shorncliffe.

In the summer of 1907, he applied to become Chief Constable of Leicester – a move which would have meant leaving the Army – but did not succeed; the job went to John Hall-Dalwood, a lawyer and ex-Army officer who had made a career in the police. He settled into the undemanding life of a home posting, with an active social as well as sporting calendar; he and Edward Challenor, a fellow officer in the battalion, won the garrison tennis cup two years running, and Blackader was recorded to have made a good showing at sports as diverse as billiards and soccer. Blackader had passed the exams for "tactical fitness for command" of a battalion in 1908, and was given command of a battalion and promoted to lieutenant colonel in September 1912.

== First World War ==
In August 1914, on the outbreak of the First World War, Blackader was in India, commanding the 2nd Battalion of the Leicesters, which was mobilised for service as part of the 20th (Garhwal) Brigade of the 7th (Meerut) Division. The division was sent to France as part of Indian Expeditionary Force A, seeing its first action in the trenches on 29 October. On 19 December a force under Blackader's command staged a successful attack on the German trenches, though the attack was overshadowed by the beginning of the German attack on Givenchy the following day, through which the Leicesters remained in reserve.

=== Garhwal Brigade ===
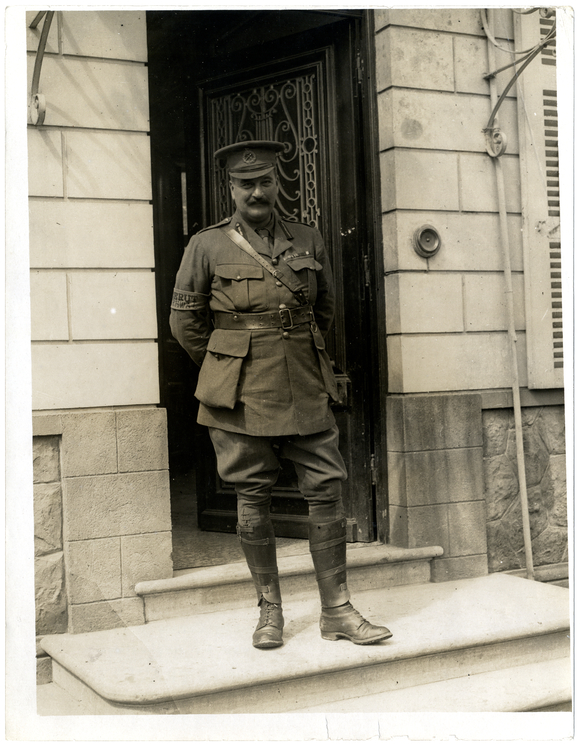
Brigadier General Blackader outside his headquarters, July 1915.

Major General Henry Keary, commanding the Garhwals, was promoted to command the Lahore Division in January 1915, and on 8 January Blackader was given the temporary rank of brigadier general, assuming command of the Garhwal Brigade in his stead. He was promoted to brevet colonel in February. The Garhwals led the first wave of the Indian Corps' attack at the Battle of Neuve Chapelle on 10 March, Three of the attacking battalions reached their objectives, but one was delayed by strong resistance; after clearing the last German trenches, the brigade halted to let the second wave pass through. In the attack, two men were awarded the Victoria Cross, and nine the Indian Order of Merit, and Blackader was commended by his corps commander, Lieutenant General Willcocks, who wrote that "I had learned to respect him and to trust in his judgement. The manner in which he handled his brigade at Neuve Chapelle was good to see, and his report ... is written as brave and modest men write". His force had taken heavy losses, however; the trailing battalion on the flank, the 2/39th Garhwal Rifles, lost over half its men and all its officers.

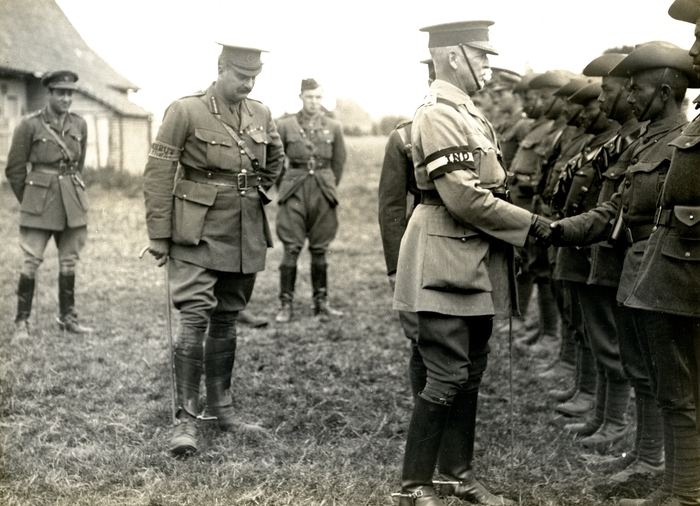
General Willcocks talking to Indian officers at an inspection parade near Merville, France, July 1915. Stood not far behind him is Brigadier General Blackader.

The brigade repulsed a heavy attack on the morning of 12 March, but settled into a relatively static position thereafter. On 9 May, the Garhwal Brigade was used as a second wave in the first attacks of the Battle of Aubers Ridge, without success; they saw action again on the night of 15 May, where the leading battalions met heavy resistance and Blackader was forced to call off the attack.

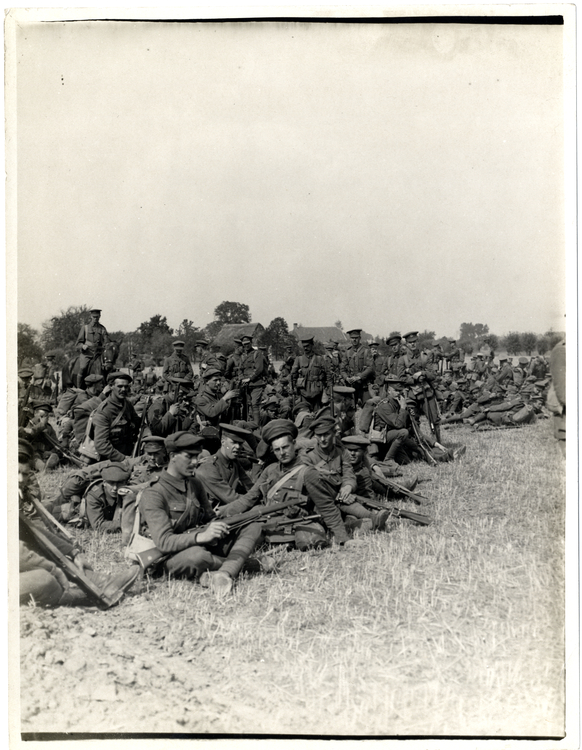
Men of the 2nd Battalion, Leicestershire Regiment, Garhwal Brigade, resting in early September, during preparation for the Battle of Loos.

After Aubers Ridge, the corps was then rested in a quiet sector until September, when it deployed for the Battle of Loos. The initial attack was to be made by three divisions, with the Meerut Division leading the attack on the Indian front; Blackader's brigade, with two Gurkha battalions and the 2nd Leicesters, was on its right flank. Whilst the attack successfully crossed no-man's land under cover of the barrage, the right flank of the brigade was caught up in defensive wire, and only one battalion successfully made their way into the German trenches; the brigade lost momentum and dug in.

The Indian Corps was withdrawn after Loos, and as a result this was Blackader's last major action in command of Indian troops; by the end of November, the Meerut Division had left France.

=== Ireland ===
Blackader was transferred to command of the 177th (2/1st Lincoln and Leicester) Brigade, part of the 59th (2nd North Midland) Division in January 1916, when he was also made an aide-de-camp (extra) to King George V. The 59th was a second-line Territorial Force division, formed from those Territorials and new volunteers who had not volunteered for overseas service. As a result, it was generally undermanned and underequipped, with priority given to equipping its first-line counterpart, and tasked mostly with home defence duties. The 177th Brigade had been formed as the duplicate of the 138th (Lincoln and Leicester) Brigade, with two second-line battalions of the Lincolnshire Regiment (later the Royal Lincolnshire Regiment) and two of Blackader's own Leicestershire Regiment.

The 59th Division was rushed to Ireland in response to the Easter Rising of April 1916, where Blackader's new brigade saw its first active service. Following the Rising, many of those believed by the British authorities to be responsible were tried by military courts; ninety were sentenced to death, of whom fifteen were eventually executed. Blackader, as a senior officer, chaired a number of courts-martial, including those of Éamonn Ceannt, Thomas Clarke, Thomas MacDonagh, Patrick Pearse, and Joseph Plunkett, five of the seven signatories to the Proclamation of the Irish Republic. It appears that Blackader found this task difficult; after Pearse's trial, he is reported to have commented that "I have just done one of the hardest tasks I have ever had to do. I have had to condemn to death one of the finest characters I have ever come across. There must be something very wrong in the state of things that makes a man like that a rebel. I don't wonder that his pupils adored him."

=== 38th (Welsh) Division ===
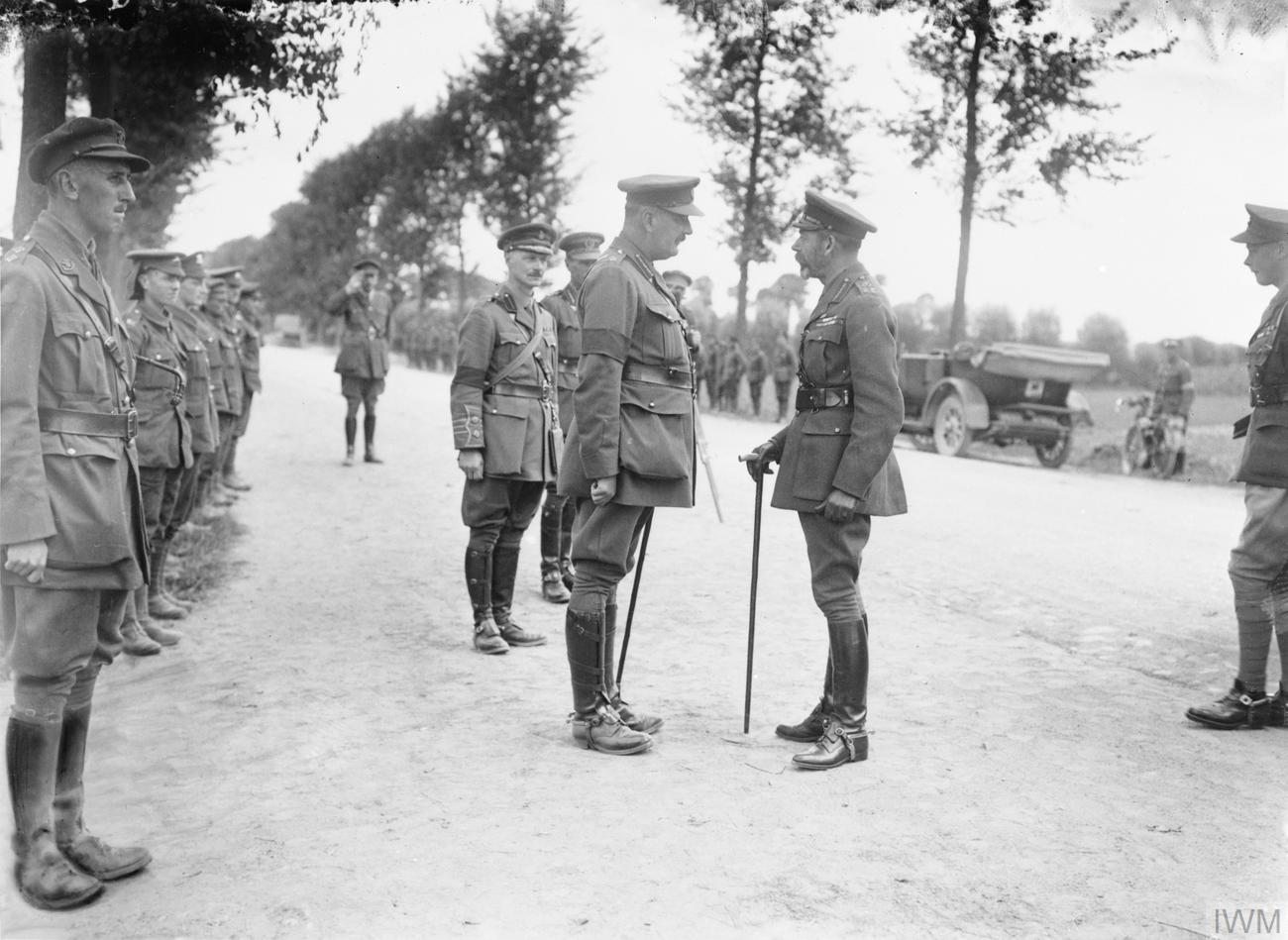
King George V (centre right) speaks with Major General Blackader (centre left) while visiting the division, 13 August 1916.

On 21 June, Blackader was ordered to leave the brigade and go to France; he described the news of the unexpected posting as "like a bombshell". On 9 July, when Major General Ivor Philipps was removed from command of 38th (Welsh) Division, due to the failure of its hitherto limited attacks against Mametz Wood during the early stages of the Battle of the Somme as well as the poor communication between the division and corps headquarters, Blackader was named as the preferred replacement by Lieutenant General Sir Henry Horne, general officer commanding (GOC) of the XV Corps, the 38th's superior formation. Horne was overruled, and the command was temporarily given to Major General Herbert Watts, then GOC 7th Division. Under Watts, the division successfully took its objective, Mametz Wood, though with severe losses; within a week, Watts was back in command of the 7th Division and Blackader had taken permanent command, with the temporary rank of major general from 12 July.

The division had been raised in the New Armies in 1914 with a strong sense of Liberal patronage, and many of its officers had been personally appointed by Prime Minister David Lloyd George; as a result, political convenience had often taken priority over military competence when selecting officers. Under Blackader, a new officer from outside the Welsh Liberal milieu and able to sack his subordinates as he saw fit, the division's standard improved significantly. It saw service at Pilckem Ridge in the early stages of the Third Battle of Ypres, but from September 1917 onwards it was kept on relatively quiet defensive sectors. The division trained through this period, and in April 1918 was able to mount a limited brigade-size attack, which whilst it involved heavy losses was a clear success in a way that would not have been possible two years earlier.

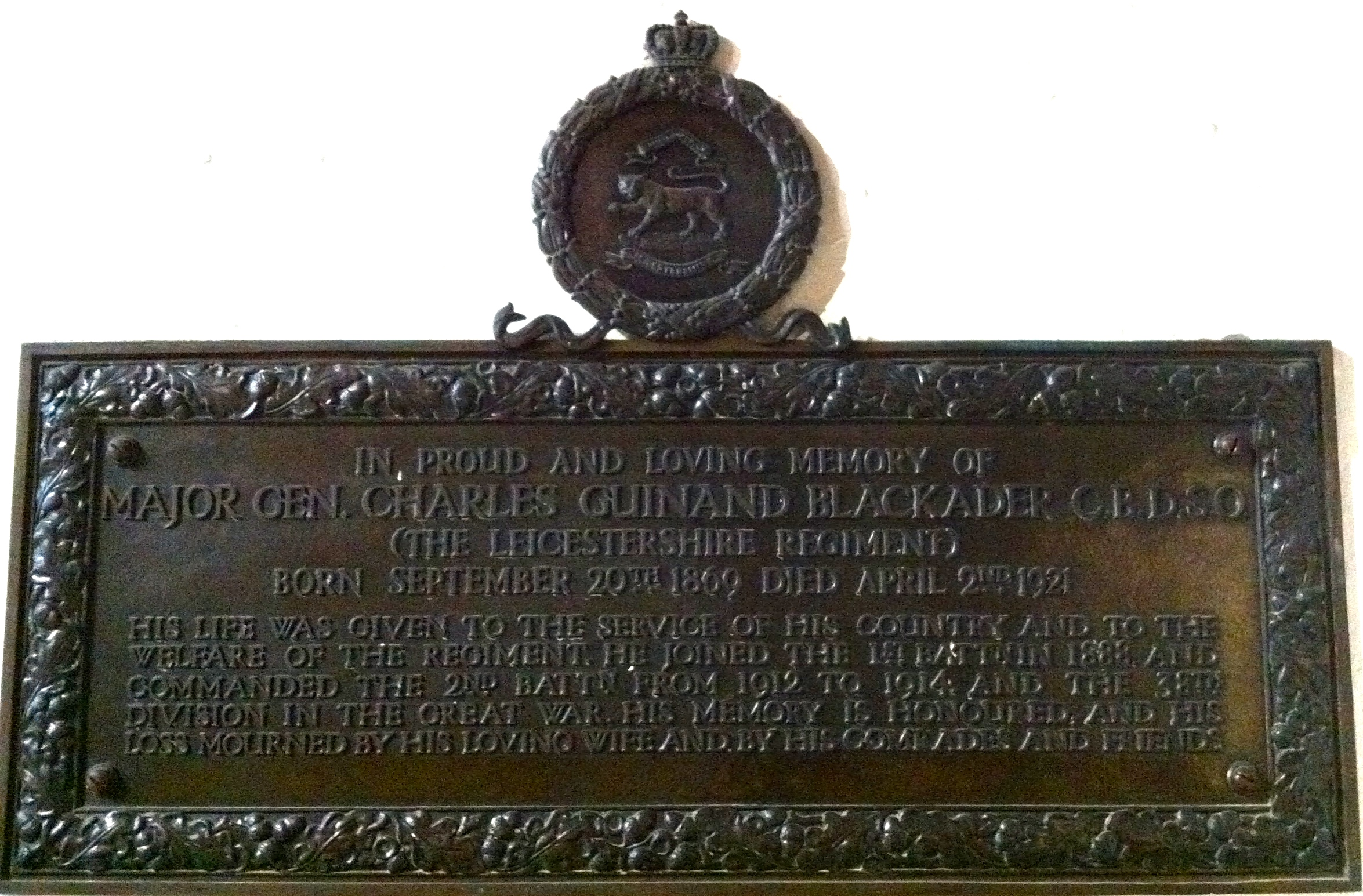
Memorial to Major General Charles Guinand Blackader in Leicester Cathedral.

In late May 1918, Blackader, who in January had been promoted to the substantive rank of major general, was relieved of command and replaced by Major General Thomas Cubitt, a younger officer. This was not apparently due to incompetence or age – the commander-in-chief (C-in-C) of the British Expeditionary Force (BEF), Field Marshal Sir Douglas Haig, had described Blackader's achievements with the 38th Division as "excellent" – but due to illness; according to Gary Sheffield, he had fallen ill after "being licked by a rabid dog". Under Cubitt's command, the 38th Division would build on its past training and fight through the Hundred Days Offensive with great success.

== Post-War ==
The grave of Major General Charles Blackader

On 21 November 1918, ten days after the armistice of 11 November 1918 which ended the war, Blackader was appointed to command the Southern District in Ireland, serving until 1 February 1920.

For his service in the war, he was appointed an aide-de-camp to the King in 1916, and made a Companion of the Order of the Bath in January 1917. He was also, in 1918, made a Commander of the Belgian Order of Leopold, and awarded both the Belgian and French Croix de Guerre.

Blackader died, of liver cancer and heart failure on 2 April 1921, at Queen Alexandra Military Hospital, survived by his wife and two daughters, and leaving a small estate of just under £450. There is a memorial to him in the regimental chapel in Leicester Cathedral.

On 1 March 2013, as a result of research into the circumstances of his death by the In From The Cold Project, he was accepted for commemoration by the Commonwealth War Graves Commission in their United Kingdom Book of Remembrance, until June when his grave had been belatedly found at Putney Vale Cemetery (Section K).

== Notes ==
Military offices
Preceded by Ivor Philipps	GOC 38th (Welsh) Division; 1916–1918	Succeeded by Thomas Cubitt
