= Margaret Frances Andrews =

American show dog breeder (1894–1945)

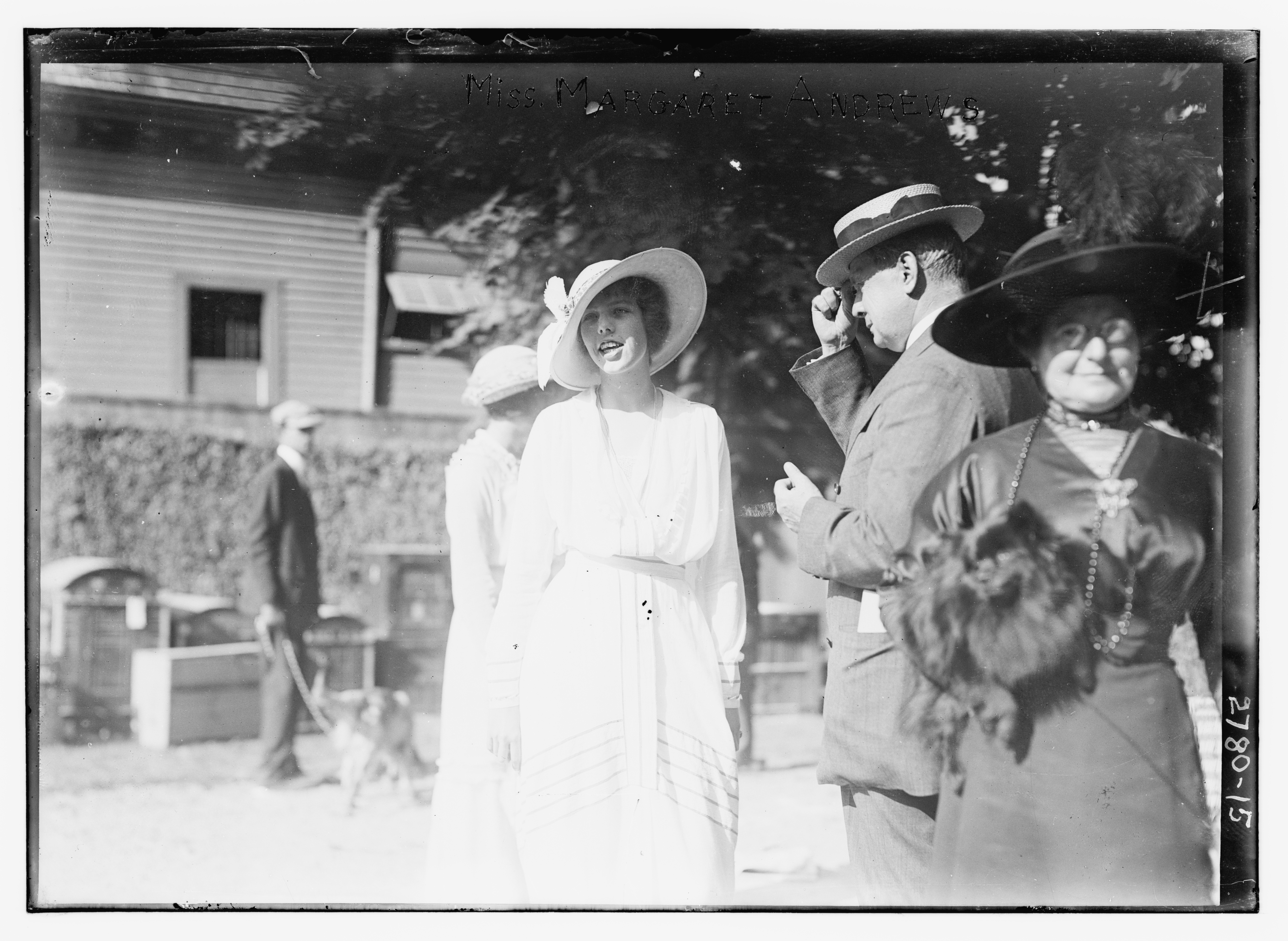
- Andrews at the Newport Dog Show
- Born: 1894; Newport, Rhode Island, U.S.
- Died: November 2, 1945 (aged 50–51)
- Occupation: Dog breeder

Margaret Frances Andrews (1894 – November 2, 1945) was a Newport, Rhode Island, socialite and prize-winning show dog breeder.

== Biography ==
She was born in 1894 to Paul A. Andrews in Newport, Rhode Island. In 1915 she married Morgan Belmont (1892–1953), the son of August Belmont, at her parents' home, Rockry Hall. "The occasion marked the union of members of two of the oldest families in Newport's social history, and a representative gathering of the Summer colony was present. Owing to the bride's family being in mourning, the number of guests was limited to 150." Her daughter, Margaret Andrews Morgan Belmont, was born in August 1917. Margaret Frances Andrews died on November 2, 1945.

Andrews had a small role in the film Way Down East (1920) where she was credited as Mrs. Morgan Belmont.
