= Karl Hopf =

Karl Hopf may refer to:

- Karl Hopf (historian)
- Karl Hopf (serial killer)
