= Thomas Cubitt (British Army officer) =

British Army general

General Sir Thomas Cubitt KCB CMG DSO
- Cubitt in 1931
- Born: 9 April 1871; Great Yarmouth, Norfolk, England
- Died: 19 May 1939 (aged 68)
- Military career
- Allegiance: United Kingdom
- Branch: British Army
- Service years: 1891–1936
- Rank: General
- Unit: Royal Artillery
- Commands: Troops in Somaliland; 57th Infantry Brigade; 38th (Welsh) Division; 3rd Infantry Brigade; 54th Division; Presidency and Assam District; 53rd (Welsh) Division; 2nd Division
- Conflicts: First World War
- Awards: Knight Commander of the Order of the Bath; Companion of the Order of St Michael and St George; Distinguished Service Order; Mentioned in Despatches
- Other work: Governor of Bermuda (1931–1936)

General Sir Thomas Astley Cubitt, KCB, CMG, DSO (9 April 1871 – 19 May 1939) was a British Army officer of the late nineteenth and early twentieth centuries, who commanded a division in the First World War and in retirement served as Governor of Bermuda.

Cubitt was the youngest son of a family of rural gentry in Norfolk, who joined the Royal Artillery in 1891. He requested colonial service, and spent five years in Africa, where he was involved in the creation of the West African Frontier Force and served in a number of campaigns in northern Nigeria. Shortly before the outbreak of the First World War, he was appointed as Deputy Commissioner in Somaliland, where he mounted a series of campaigns against the Dervish State.

He requested a transfer to the Western Front in 1916, and commanded an infantry battalion and a brigade before being promoted to take command of the 38th (Welsh) Division in early 1918. He led the division until the armistice of 11 November 1918, with marked success. Following the war, he held a series of peacetime commands in Germany, Egypt, and the United Kingdom, before being made Governor of Bermuda in 1931. He held this position until 1936, when he retired.

== Family background ==
Born at Great Yarmouth on 9 April 1871, Thomas was the third son of Major Frank Astley Cubitt and his wife Bertha, daughter of Captain Thomas Blakiston of the Royal Navy. The family resided at Thorpe Hall in Norwich, with an estate at Fritton, near Great Yarmouth. Major Cubitt came from a family of rural gentry, and had attended Rugby and Jesus College, Cambridge before entering the British Army in 1853 as an ensign in the 5th Regiment of Foot. He saw service in the Indian Mutiny before returning to England to act as adjutant to volunteer battalions of the Norfolk Regiment, and retired from the army in 1889. He later served as a Justice of the Peace and chair of the local district council.

Cubitt's eldest brother, Bertram Blakiston (b. 1862), attended Balliol College, Oxford before entering the civil service; he would later serve as the private secretary to the Conservative politicians Edward Stanhope, Secretary of State for War, in 1890–91, and St John Brodrick, Under-Secretary of State for War, in 1896–98. He was knighted in 1920. The middle brother, Julian Francis (b. 1869) studied at Selwyn College, Cambridge, but does not appear to have had an active public career. Their one sister, Helen, married a German economist, Dr. Moritz Julius Bonn, in 1903.

== Early career ==
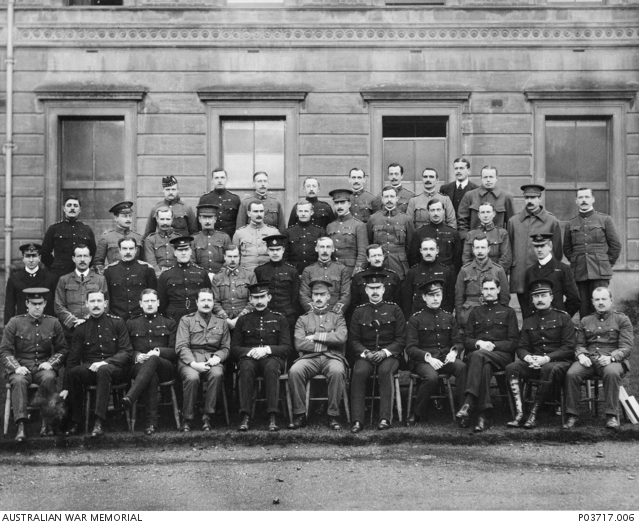
Group portrait of officers at the British Staff College at Camberley, England, 1906. Thomas Cubitt, then a major, is sat in the front row, third on the right.

Thomas Cubitt attended Haileybury, as his brother Julian had done, but rather than attend university he studied at the Royal Military Academy, Woolwich, before being commissioned into the Royal Artillery as a second lieutenant on 13 February 1891. After service in India, promotion to lieutenant on 13 February 1894, and a course at the Staff College, Camberley, he requested a transfer to a colonial posting. He was sent to West Africa in 1898, and appointed as commander of the artillery in the Northern Nigeria Protectorate on its formation in early 1900, alongside a promotion to captain on 13 February 1900. Whilst in Nigeria, he was closely involved in the formation of the Nigeria Regiment in the West African Frontier Force. He saw active duty in a number of expeditions between 1900 and 1903, including as Staff officer to Colonel George Kemball in the January 1901 expedition to defeat the Emir of Kontagora, and culminating in the command of a battalion of mounted infantry during the Kano-Sokoto campaign of 1903. For his service in Africa, he was mentioned in despatches several times (including 31 August 1901), promoted to the brevet rank of Major on 21 March 1901, and awarded the Distinguished Service Order (DSO). He returned to regimental duties in the United Kingdom in 1905, and from 1908, when he was promoted from supernumerary captain to captain, to 1911 he served as a brigade major in Ireland with 3rd Cavalry Brigade. On 29 July 1914 he was seconded from his regiment in order to serve with the Colonial Office.

== First World War ==
In July 1914, Cubitt was appointed Deputy Commissioner and Officer Commanding for the Somaliland Protectorate; after the disastrous Battle of Dul Madoba, the colonial administration was seeking to restore British control over the inland areas of the Protectorate. Cubitt planned and commanded a series of operations through the winter of 1914–15, destroying several Dhulbahante garesas (Dervish forts). Shortly after he arrived in Somaliland, the First World War had broken out, and once the winter campaign was over he requested to be transferred to Europe; the request was granted, but it took until early 1916 for him to be replaced and make his way home. For his services in Africa, he was appointed a Companion of the Order of St Michael and St George and a Companion of the Order of the Bath, and promoted to lieutenant colonel in April 1915 and later to brevet colonel.

Cubitt turned down the opportunity of a staff posting on the Western Front to request a front-line command, and briefly commanded the 8th (Service) Battalion, Lincolnshire Regimeht in early 1917, before succeeding Brigadier General Colin Robert Ballard in command of the 57th Infantry Brigade in April, which also saw him promoted to the temporary rank of brigadier general while holding his new appointment. The brigade saw service at Messines and Ypres in 1917, and in the German spring offensive of early 1918. He was promoted to brevet colonel in January 1918. He was then appointed to take command of the 38th (Welsh) Division in late May or early June 1918, after its previous general officer commanding (GOC), Major General Charles Blackader, had fallen ill.

An officer in one of the 38th Division's infantry battalions, who met Cubitt in early June, shortly after he took command, described him as "a very large and fierce-looking major-general, with two rows of ribbons, and a gleam in his eye", who proceeded to interrogate a subaltern about the exact type and position of his unit's trench latrines, apparently something of a pet topic. A "fire-eater with a marvellous flow of language", it was Cubitt's manner of speech, more than anything else, which made an impact on his contemporaries; a front-line officer in 1918 described watching him, during the October offensive, clearing a traffic jam with merely "a magnificent gush of language". A colleague from his early days in the artillery described him as a "perpetual joy to the soldier's world ... because of his picturesque language, which never gave offence because it was so absolutely natural and so aptly fitted the occasion", but under some circumstances it proved less suitable. Following a failed raid in 1918, he visited the offending battalion and harangued the officers collectively for some time, before demanding that they "damn well had to do the raid over again, and damn well see that [they] made a proper job of it, or, by God, damn well go on raiding until [they] damn well did." To the officers on the receiving end, already tired and dissatisfied, this was seen as a "contemptible exhibition" for a senior officer to make.

Regardless of his personal style, Cubitt was credited by Field Marshal Sir Douglas Haig, the commander-in-chief (C-in-C) of the British Expeditionary Force on the Western Front, with achieving the desired results. The 38th Division had mounted a successful but very costly attack in April 1918; under Major General Cubitt's command, the division mounted two further major operations, at the Battle of Albert in August and Battle of Cambrai in October. Both were successful, with the division demonstrating flexibility, improvisation, and a highly effective tactical doctrine. The division's performance at Cambrai was sufficiently good to rank it as one of the most effective British divisions during the Hundred Days Offensive.

== Postwar career ==
Cubitt remained with the 38th Division until the end of the war, and in March 1919 was transferred to command the 3rd Infantry Brigade in the British Army of the Rhine. In June his rank of major general became substantive. Shortly afterwards, in August, he was posted to take over the demobilising 54th (East Anglian) Division in Egypt, remaining with them until October, when the final units sailed for England.

In November 1920, Cubitt was appointed to command the Presidency and Assam District in eastern India. The same year, he married Mary Grissell (née Wood), the widow of an officer in the Norfolk Regiment. He returned to England in 1924, remaining on half-pay until he took command of the 53rd (Welsh) Infantry Division, a Territorial Army (TA) formation, in June 1927, taking over from Major General Sir Thomas Marden. In October 1928 he relinquished command of the 53rd Division and transferred to the command of the 2nd Division, a Regular Army formation, and was promoted to lieutenant general in December 1930.

In 1931, he was knighted and appointed governor of Bermuda, holding the post for five years before retiring in 1936. He was promoted to general in June 1935, and from 1931 to his death held the ceremonial position of colonel commandant of the Royal Artillery.

Cubitt died at the age of 68 on 19 May 1939, leaving an estate of £19,000.

== Notes ==
Military offices
Preceded by Charles Blackader	GOC 38th (Welsh) Division; 1918–1919	Succeeded by Charles Blackader
Preceded by Steuart Hare	GOC 54th (East Anglian) Division; 1919	Post disbanded
Preceded by Sir Thomas Marden	GOC 53rd (Welsh) Infantry Division; 1927–1928	Succeeded by Charles Deedes
Preceded by Edmund Ironside	GOC 2nd Division; 1928–1931	Succeeded by Henry Jackson
Government offices
Preceded by Sir Louis Bols	Governor of Bermuda; 1931–1936	Succeeded by Sir Reginald Hildyard
