= Philanthropin =

Jewish elementary school and gymnasium in Frankfurt, Germany

Coordinates: 50.1211°N 8.6872°E

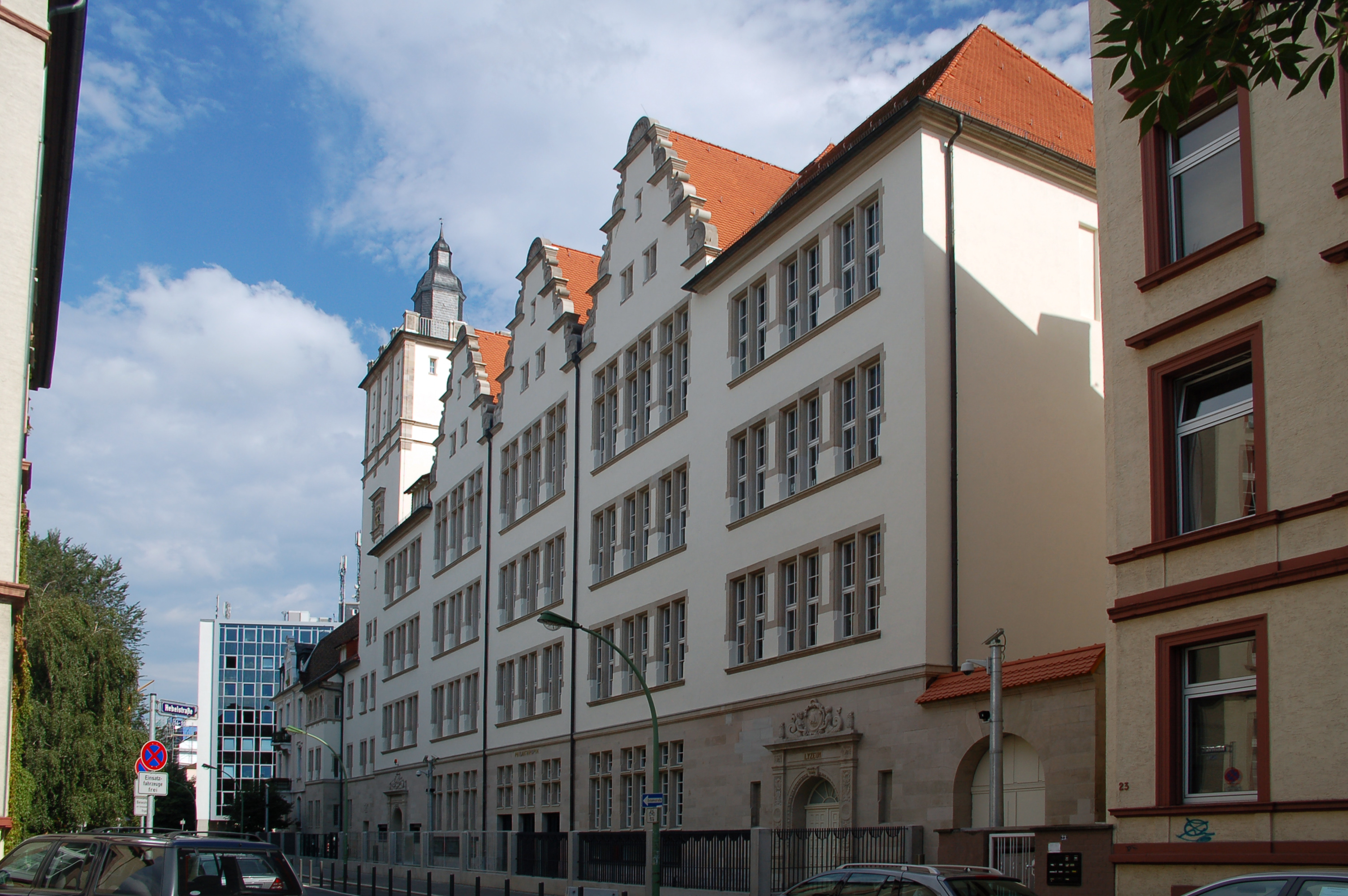
The Philanthropin's school building from 1908

The Philanthropin (Greek for "place of humanity") is a Jewish elementary school and gymnasium in Frankfurt, Germany. It was founded in 1804 by Mayer Amschel Rothschild.

== History ==
Formally, the school was established by Siegmund Geisenheimer, the chief accountant of Mayer Amschel Rothschild, with Rothschild's support. The school was supported financially by the government and was from the start also open to non-Jewish pupils.

The school's motto was "for enlightenment and humanity." The school became a prominent centre of liberal Judaism in the 19th century; many of its teachers were active in the Jewish reform movement. In the late 19th century the school started to experience economic difficulties due to the fact that Jewish parents increasingly sent their children to non-religious public schools, and the Jewish community spent more than half of its budget on the school. The current school building was built in 1908. The school experienced a new golden era during the Weimar Republic under the leadership of Otto Driesen. At its peak it had around 1,000 pupils. The high school remained open until April 1941, while the elementary school had to close in June 1942.

From 1954 the former school building served as offices for the Jewish community. In 1966 it was proposed to reopen the school, but the proposal failed. In 1978 the Jewish community decided to sell the building to the city to finance a new Jewish community centre in the Frankfurt West End. The building was then used by the city as a public community centre and was renovated during the 1980s. From 1986 to 2004 it was the seat of the Hoch Conservatory and was additionally used by a theatre company. In 2006/2007 the building became the seat of the I. E. Lichtigfeld-Schule, a Jewish school founded in 1966. The school is now commonly referred to as the Philanthropin.

The school currently has around 400 pupils. Around two thirds have a Jewish background. The Philanthropin is a neighbour of the Musterschule, a noted progressive gymnasium, which is found on the other side of Eckenheimer Landstraße.

=== Notable teachers ===
- Joseph Franz Molitor

=== Notable pupils ===
- August Belmont
- Moritz Julius Bonn
- Josef Horovitz

== See also ==
- Hoch Conservatory

== Literature ==
- Albert Hirsch: Das Philanthropin zu Frankfurt am Main. Verlag Waldemar Kramer, Frankfurt am Main 1964.
