= Bertram Cubitt =

Sir Bertram Blakiston Cubitt KCB (20 August 1862 – 23 September 1942) was a civil servant in the British War Office.

== Origins ==
Bertram Cubitt was the eldest son of Major Frank Astley Cubitt and his wife Bertha, daughter of Captain Thomas Blakiston of the Royal Navy. The family resided at Thorpe Hall in Norwich, with an estate at Fritton, near Yarmouth. His father came from a family of rural gentry, and had attended Rugby and Jesus College, Cambridge before entering the Army in 1853. He saw service in the Indian Mutiny before returning to England, and retired from the Army in 1889. He later served as a Justice of the Peace and chair of the local district council. Cubitt's youngest brother, Thomas, also joined the Army, rising to command a division during the First World War and finishing his career as Governor of Bermuda.

== Career ==
Cubitt was educated at Rugby School. He matriculated in 1881 at Balliol College, Oxford, from which he graduated in 1885. He joined the War Office in 1886. From 1890 to 1891 he was Acting Assistant Private Secretary to Edward Stanhope, Secretary of State for War, and from 1896 to 1898 he was Private Secretary to St John Brodrick, Under-Secretary of State for War. He was appointed Assistant Under-Secretary of State in 1914 and held the post until his retirement in 1926.

Cubitt was appointed Companion of the Order of the Bath (CB) in 1911 and Knight Commander of the Order of the Bath (KCB) in the 1920 New Year War Honours.

Cubitt was a member of the Bath and County Club. His funeral was held at Golders Green crematorium on 27 September 1942.

== Family ==
Cubitt married Leila Leslie, the daughter of William Norman Leslie, an officer in the Gordon Highlanders, in 1899. The couple had two sons, John and Alan.
