= Gustav Muss-Arnolt =

German painter

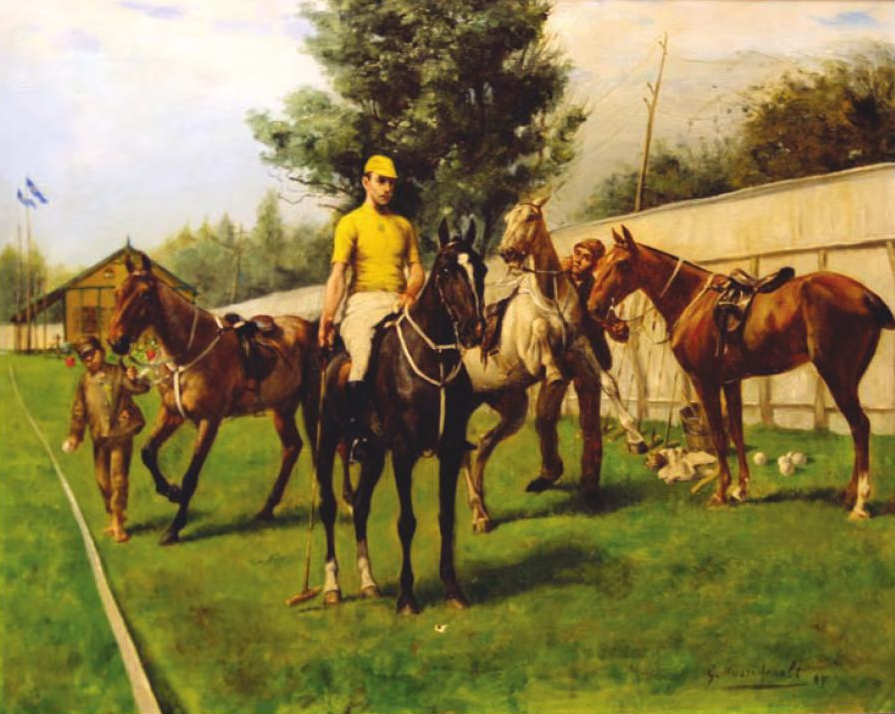
Raymond Rodgers Belmont on Domino circa 1880 painted by Gustav Muss-Arnolt

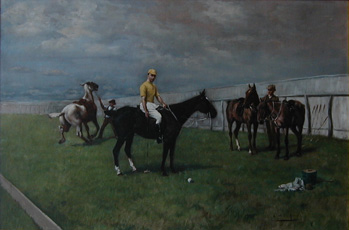
Raymond Rodgers Belmont on Domino by Gustav Muss-Arnolt in 1880

Gustav Muss-Arnolt (1858 – February 9, 1927) was a painter who specialized in animal portraits. He painted waterfowl, dogs and horses. He was a director of the American Kennel Club.

== Biography ==
He was born in Germany in 1858. Around 1890 he migrated to the United States and lived in New York City.

He moved to Tuckahoe, New York. He died on February 9, 1927.
