= Karl Hopf (serial killer) =

German serial killer

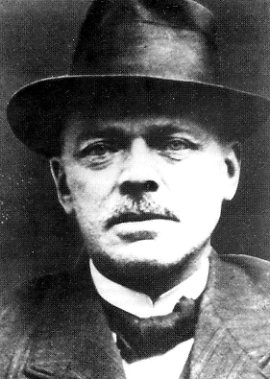
- Hopf in 1912
- Born: 26 March 1863; Free City of Frankfurt
- Died: 23 March 1914 (aged 50); Royal Prison Preungesheim, German Empire
- Status: Executed by guillotine
- Convictions: Murder (4 counts); Attempted murder
- Penalty: Death

Details
- Victims: 4
- Span of crimes: 1902–1906
- Country: German Empire
- Date apprehended: 14 April 1913

Karl Hopf (26 March 1863 – 23 March 1914) was a German serial killer. He was sentenced to death by a Frankfurt jury on 19 January 1914 for the murder of his wives, father, and daughter, as well as for other, attempted murders.

== Life ==
Karl Hopf attended the Musterschule and left after the Untersekunda. He began work as a pharmacist in London and lived temporarily in Casablanca and India. There he trained in and mastered fencing. At the turn of the century he ran a kennel in Niederhöchstadt, today part of Eschborn. Upon the sale of one of his dogs he received the substantial sum of 10,000 gold marks.

== Murders ==
In 1902 he married his first wife, Josefa Henel, from Niederhöchstadt. She died the same year on 28 November after a short illness. From her life insurance he received 20,000 gold marks. He then married Auguste Christine, née Schneider, who also began suffering from health problems. She divorced Hopf, left him, and died soon afterward. Hopf was unable, however, to collect the life insurance amount of 30,000 gold marks. His daughter, Elsa, died in 1906.

In the following years Hopf appeared in variety shows under the pseudonym "Athos" as a champion in fencing.

In 1912 he married Dresden-native Wally Siewec in London. They insured themselves for 80,000 gold marks "on mutuality." His third wife soon became ill with severe gastrointestinal disease. She was treated at the Deaconess Hospital in Frankfurt, where she began to feel better. The toxicology specialist, Dr. Rossmann, recognized symptoms of severe poisoning and consulted forensic physician Georg Popp.

== Investigations ==
A search of Hopf's home revealed large amounts of various highly concentrated poisons, including arsenic, digitalis, and live cultures of typhoid and cholera bacilli. He was arrested on 14 April 1913, at which time Hopf had with him a bottle of cyanide, which was seized by the police.

== Trial ==
The trial in front of the jury in Frankfurt lasted from 9 to 19 January 1914 and was very well received by the public. More than 64 witnesses and experts were invited and heard. During the trial, it came to light that Hopf had murdered his father, first wife, illegitimate child, and his daughter Elsa from his second marriage with poison. He secretly, often over long periods of time, poisoned all the victims, mostly hiding the poison in foods and drinks.

In an exhumation of the bodies of all his deceased relatives, the forensic pathologist Popp succeeded for the first time in criminal history in scientifically detecting poison in the bones and body parts.

== Execution ==
After he was sentenced to death, Karl Hopf was guillotined on 23 March 1914 in the courtyard of the Royal Prison Preungesheim.

== See also ==
- List of serial killers by country
