= SS August Belmont =

Liberty ship of WWII

History

United States
- Name: August Belmont
- Namesake: August Belmont
- Owner: War Shipping Administration (WSA)
- Operator: South Atlantic Steamship Lines, Inc.
- Ordered: as type (EC2-S-C1) hull, MC hull 2474
- Awarded: 23 April 1943
- Builder: St. Johns River Shipbuilding Company, Jacksonville, Florida
- Cost: $1,109,608
- Yard number: 38
- Way number: 2
- Laid down: 1 March 1944
- Launched: 23 April 1944
- Sponsored by: Mrs. W.H. Slappey
- Completed: 4 May 1944
- Identification: Call sign: KWWQ
- Fate: Laid up in the, National Defense Reserve Fleet, Wilmington, North Carolina, 30 May 1948; Laid up in the, James River Reserve Fleet, Lee Hall, Virginia, 20 February 1958; Sold for scrapping, 24 July 1970, removed from fleet, 19 August 1970

General characteristics
- Class & type: Liberty ship; type EC2-S-C1, standard
- Tonnage: 10,865 LT DWT; 7,176 GRT
- Displacement: 3,380 long tons (3,434 t) (light); 14,245 long tons (14,474 t) (max)
- Length: 441 feet 6 inches (135 m) oa; 416 feet (127 m) pp; 427 feet (130 m) lwl
- Beam: 57 feet (17 m)
- Draft: 27 ft 9.25 in (8.4646 m)
- Installed power: 2 × Oil fired 450 °F (232 °C) boilers, operating at 220 psi (1,500 kPa); 2,500 hp (1,900 kW)
- Propulsion: 1 × triple-expansion steam engine, (manufactured by Filer and Stowell, Milwaukee, Wisconsin); 1 × screw propeller
- Speed: 11.5 knots (21.3 km/h; 13.2 mph)
- Capacity: 562,608 cubic feet (15,931 m^{3}) (grain); 499,573 cubic feet (14,146 m^{3}) (bale)
- Complement: 38–62 USMM; 21–40 USNAG
- Armament: Varied by ship; Bow-mounted 3-inch (76 mm)/50-caliber gun; Stern-mounted 4-inch (102 mm)/50-caliber gun; 2–8 × single 20-millimeter (0.79 in) Oerlikon anti-aircraft (AA) cannons and/or, 2–8 × 37-millimeter (1.46 in) M1 AA guns

SS August Belmont was a Liberty ship built in the United States during World War II. She was named after August Belmont, a German-American politician, financier, foreign diplomat, and party chairman of the Democratic National Committee during the 1860s. Belmont was a U.S. Ambassador to the Netherlands and U.S. Consul-General to the Austrian Empire and later a horse-breeder and racehorse owner. He was the founder and namesake of the Belmont Stakes.

== Construction ==
August Belmont was laid down on 1 March 1944, under a Maritime Commission (MARCOM) contract, MC hull 2474, by the St. Johns River Shipbuilding Company, Jacksonville, Florida; she was sponsored by Mrs. W.H. Slappey, the sister of Max and Kenneth Merrill, the president and vice president of St. John's River SB, and was launched on 20 April 1944.

== History ==
She was allocated to the South Atlantic Steamship Lines, on 30 April 1944. On 30 May 1948, she was laid up in the National Defense Reserve Fleet, Wilmington, North Carolina. On 20 February 1958, she was laid up in the James River Reserve Fleet, Lee Hall, Virginia. She was sold for scrapping, 24 July 1970, to I.C.E. Chemicals, Inc., for $113,099. She was removed from the fleet on 19 August 1970.

== Bibliography ==
- "St. John's River Shipbuilding, Jacksonville FL". www.ShipbuildingHistory.com. 16 October 2010.
- Maritime Administration. "August Belmont". Ship History Database Vessel Status Card. U.S. Department of Transportation, Maritime Administration.
- Davies, James (May 2004). "Specifications (As-Built)" (PDF). p. 23.
- "SS August Belmont".
