= Morgan Belmont =

American banker (1892–1953)

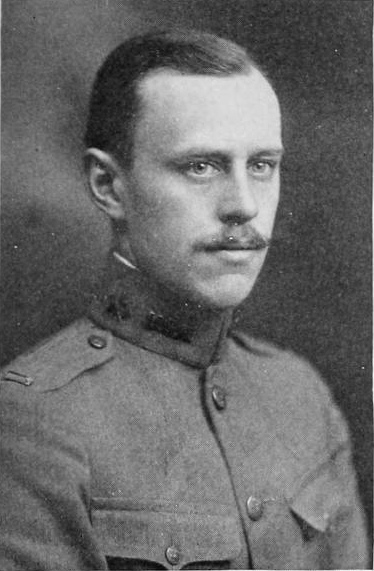
- Born: March 19, 1892; Hempstead, New York
- Died: September 17, 1953 (aged 61); East Hampton, New York
- Spouse: Margaret Frances Andrews
- Parent(s): August Belmont Jr. Bessie Hamilton Morgan

Morgan Belmont (March 19, 1892 – September 17, 1953) was an American banker who was head of August Belmont & Co., the banking firm.

== Biography ==
He was born on March 19, 1892, in Hempstead, New York, to August Belmont Jr. and Bessie Hamilton Morgan. He attended Harvard University and graduated in 1914. He became a senior partner in the investment house of August Belmont & Co. He retired in 1925.

In 1915, he married Margaret Frances Andrews. Her daughter, Margaret Andrews Morgan Belmont, was born in August 1917. Margaret died on November 2, 1945.

He died on September 17, 1953, aged 61, in East Hampton, New York.
