= August Belmont Jr. =

American financier (1853–1924)

August Belmont II
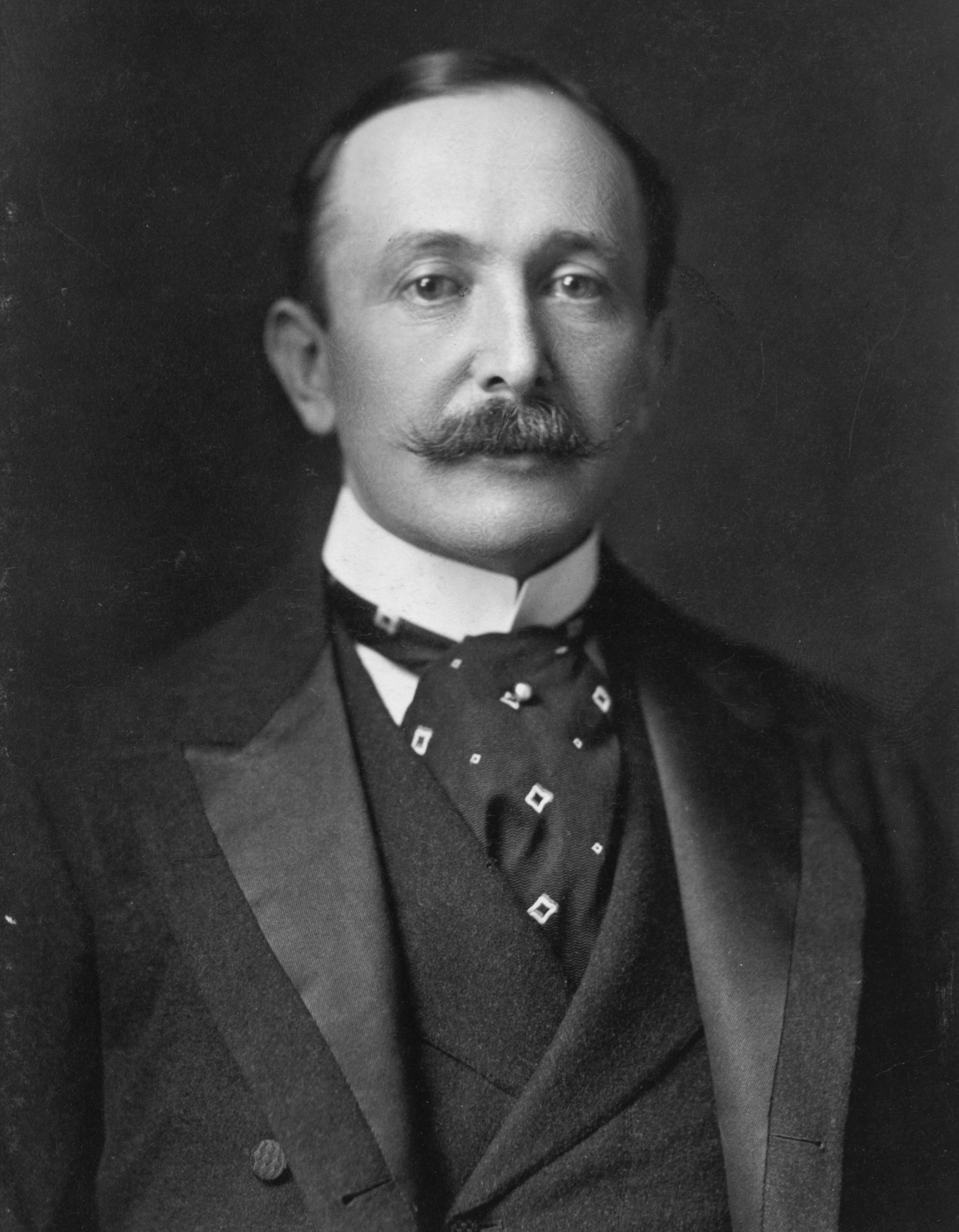
- Belmont circa 1890
- Born: February 18, 1853; Manhattan, New York City, U.S.
- Died: December 10, 1924 (aged 71); Manhattan, New York City, U.S.
- Resting place: Island Cemetery; Newport, Rhode Island, U.S.
- Other name: August Belmont Jr.
- Education: Harvard University
- Occupations: Businessman; Racehorse owner/breeder
- Political party: Democrat
- Spouse(s): Elizabeth Hamilton Morgan (m. 1881; died 1898) Eleanor Robson (m. 1910)
- Children: August Belmont III; Raymond Belmont II; Morgan Belmont
- Parent(s): August Belmont I Caroline Slidell Perry
- Relatives: Matthew C. Perry (maternal grandfather)

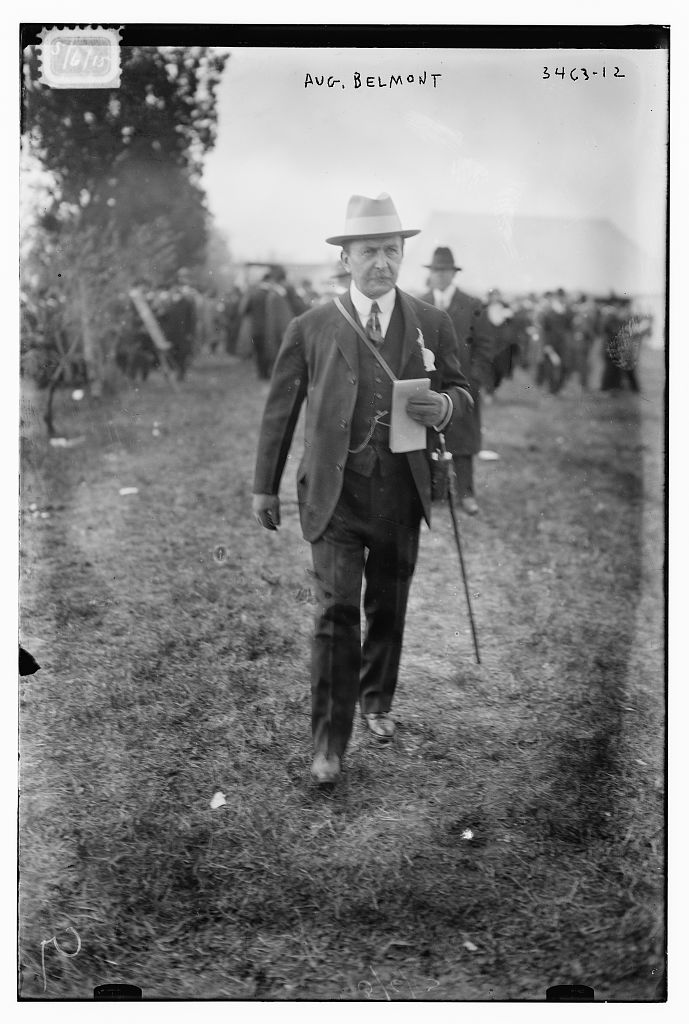
August Belmont II on May 6, 1915

August Belmont Jr. (February 18, 1853 – December 10, 1924) was an American financier. He financed the construction of the original New York City Subway line (1900–1904) and for many years headed the Interborough Rapid Transit Company, which ran the transit system. He also financed and led the construction of the Cape Cod Canal in Massachusetts, which opened in 1914. Belmont bought the land for and built New York's Belmont Park racetrack—named for his father—and was a major owner/breeder of thoroughbred racehorses. He served as chairman of the board of the Louisville and Nashville Railroad. He also served as a director of the Southern Pacific Co., parent of the railroad, and National Park Bank.

== Early life ==
He was born in Manhattan, New York City, on February 18, 1853, to Caroline Slidell Perry and August Belmont Sr. His maternal grandfather was Commodore Matthew C. Perry.

He graduated from St. Mark's School and was an 1875 graduate of Harvard University. At Harvard on the track team he introduced spiked track shoes to the United States. He was a member of Delta Kappa Epsilon at Harvard. Belmont was also a member of the Porcellian Club.

After graduation he worked at the Belmont banking house, August Belmont & Co. At the death of his father in 1890, he became the head of the company.

Belmont founded the Interborough Rapid Transit Company in 1902 to help finance the construction of and operate the first line of what is now the New York City Subway. He served as president, and, in 1907, chairman of the company. Belmont holds the distinction of owning the world's only purpose built private subway car. Named Mineola, it was used by Belmont to give tours of the IRT. The car is now preserved at the Shore Line Trolley Museum.

== World War I ==
Following the United States' entry into World War I, Belmont, at age 64, volunteered to assist the war effort and was sent to France by the United States Army. He received a commission as major in the United States Army Air Service on November 9, 1917, in France.

He was assigned to the supply department of the American Expeditionary Force (AEF) and conducted negotiations with the government of Spain to procure supplies for the AEF. He was on detached service to the United States from February 16 to October 23, 1918, when he returned to France. He returned to the United States on December 21 and was discharged from the Army on January 6, 1919. He was one of the oldest officers to serve in the U.S. Army during the First World War.

During the war, his son, Morgan Belmont, served as a lieutenant at the Aviation Instruction Center at Foggia, Italy. Another son, Raymond Belmont, served as an Infantry officer with the 78th Division in France and participated in Saint-Mihiel and Meuse-Argonne offensives.

His wife, Eleanor, also devoted much time to raising funds in aid of Belgian relief efforts and for the Red Cross, she made a number of trans-Atlantic trips as an inspector of United States Army camps.

== Cape Cod Canal ==
Belmont was instrumental in making the Cape Cod Canal a reality. The grand opening of the Cape Cod Canal took place on July 29, 1914, and it was soon plagued with troubles. Belmont's canal was expensive for mariners, costing as much as $16.00 for a trip by schooner, a considerable sum in those days, equivalent to $514 in 2025. The narrow 140-foot (43 m) width and shallow 25-foot (7.6 m) depth of the canal made navigation difficult, and tidal flows created dangerous currents, so many mariners continued to use the routes around the cape. As a result, tolls did not live up to expectations and the Cape Cod Canal became a losing proposition. As a result, the canal was purchased by the U.S. government on March 30, 1928.

== Thoroughbred horse racing ==
Like his father, Belmont was an avid Thoroughbred racing fan. According to his Time obituary, Belmont "is credited with having saved thoroughbred racing when it was at its lowest ebb in the East, after the repeal of the racing law in New York State."

Belmont served as the first president of The Jockey Club and was chairman of the New York State Racing Commission. In 1895 he was one of the nine founding members of the National Steeplechase Association.

Belmont inherited Nursery Stud, a Thoroughbred breeding operation established in 1867 by his father at his 1,100-acre (4.5 km^{2}) Babylon, New York, estate. There, Belmont raised polo ponies and played on a polo team with Harry Payne Whitney. It was here he stood the Hall of Fame stallion Kentucky. In the early 1880s, Belmont Sr. leased a farm property in Kentucky, located about three miles outside Lexington. After transferring all of the breeding business there, Belmont Jr. developed a very important stud farm whose influences are still felt today. Given the same name as the New York operation, at the Kentucky Nursery Stud he bred 129 American Stakes winners. The greatest of the horses he bred was Man o' War, born while he was serving overseas in World War I. In his absence, his wife Eleanor named the new foal "My Man o' War" in honor of her husband but because of his age and the uncertainty as to the war's end, Belmont Jr. decided to disband the stable and with the "My" dropped from the name, Man o' War was sold to Glen Riddle Farm in Maryland.

Belmont organized the Westchester Racing Association in 1895. In 1905 he built Belmont Park racetrack in Elmont, on Long Island which operates to this day as the largest thoroughbred racing facility in the state. In the year of its opening, the prestigious Belmont Stakes, inaugurated in 1867 and named in his father's honor, was transferred from the financially troubled Morris Park Racecourse. Three times, horses from Belmont's stable won the Belmont Stakes, the first coming in 1902 followed by back-to-back wins in 1916 and 1917.

Belmont was a Wright Company stockholder and he was selected to be the president of the 1910 International Aviation Meet at Belmont Park organizing committee. The venue selected for the aviation tournament was August Belmont's racetrack at Belmont Park.

Belmont also had horses competing in England and in 1908 his American-bred colt Norman III won a British Classic Race, the 2,000 Guineas. In addition to his Kentucky horse farm, in 1908 Belmont established Haras de Villers, a breeding operation near Foucarmont in Upper Normandy, France. Following the cessation of racing in New York State as a result of the Hart–Agnew Law banning parimutuel betting, Belmont stood American stallions at Haras de Villers such as Flint Rock, Ethelbert, and the sire of Norman III, Octagon. At his French farm, he bred notable horses such as Prix de Diane winner Qu'elle est Belle as well as Vulcain, one of the best three-year-olds of his generation in France.

Belmont operated the Kentucky farm until his death in 1924 after which the business was broken up and its bloodstock sold. According to Thoroughbred Heritage, today the property is home to a condominium development. Its horse cemetery, which became part of Hurstland Farm then the Nuckols Farm, is now occupied by the Rood & Riddle Equine Hospital.

His son Raymond owned Belray Farm near Middleburg, Virginia, where the Hall of Fame horse Colin lived out his final years, dying there in 1932 at the age of 27.

== Directorships ==
During the course of his career, Belmont was a director in the following businesses.

=== Construction and manufacturing ===
- American Bridge Company
- Boston, Cape Cod & New York Canal Co.
- Casein Company of America
- Golden Reward Consolidated Mining & Milling Co.
- Rapid Transit Subway Construction Co.
- Republic Iron and Steel Company
- Westinghouse Electric & Mfg. Co.

=== Financial services ===
- Bank of the State of New York
- Chatham & Phenix National Bank
- The Equitable Life Assurance Society
- Fifth Avenue Trust Company
- First National Bank of Hempstead
- Guaranty Trust Company of New York
- Manhattan Trust Company
- Mount Morris Bank
- National Park Bank
- Plaza Bank
- State Safe Deposit Vaults
- Trust Company of New Jersey

=== Transportation ===
- Brooklyn Rapid Transit Company
- Colonial City Traction Company
- Chicago, St. Paul & Milwaukee Railway
- Long Island Rail Road
- Louisville and Nashville Railroad
- Mobile and Ohio Railroad
- North American Transportation & Trading Co.
- Ohio & Little Kanawha Railroad
- Southern Pacific Transportation Company

== Club president ==
In 1893 Belmont became president of the New York Athletic Club. In 1888 he became the American Kennel Club's fourth president.

== Marriages ==
In 1881, Belmont married childhood sweetheart and next-door neighbor, Elizabeth Hamilton Morgan (1862–1898). They had three sons together, August III (1882–1919), Raymond II (1888–1934), and Morgan Belmont (1892–1953). Elizabeth died at age thirty-six while visiting Paris, France, in 1898. A widower for twelve years, on February 26, 1910, Belmont married actress Eleanor Robson.

== Death ==
He spent his last years on his 1,100-acre (4.5 km^{2}) estate in North Babylon, New York. He died on December 10, 1924, at his apartment at 550 Park Avenue. and was buried in the Belmont family plot at Island Cemetery in Newport, Rhode Island, along with his parents and his brother Perry Belmont.

His widow, Eleanor, then sold most of the estate to a property developer. She outlived her husband by fifty-five years, dying just before her 100th birthday in 1979. The remaining 158 acres (0.64 km^{2}), including the family mansion, lake, and main farm buildings, were taken over by New York State. Under the control of planner Robert Moses, the estate was later expanded to 459 acres (1.86 km^{2}) and turned into Belmont Lake State Park. The mansion served as headquarters for the Long Island State Park Commission until 1935, when it was demolished to make way for the current building. Two lines of pine trees that formerly surrounded the mansion's driveway are preserved in the median of the Southern State Parkway.
