= Gustav Weinberg =

German Author, Teacher and Poet

Gustav Weinberg (26 April 1856, Gersfeld – 1909) was a German teacher, author, dramatist and poet.

He was born to a Jewish family in Gersfeld. His father Juda Weinberg owned a tannery. He earned a PhD in literature at the University of Heidelberg in 1884 with the dissertation Das französische Schäferspiel in der ersten Hälfte des siebzehnten Jahrhunderts ("The French Pastoral Play in the First Half of the Seventeenth Century"). He then worked as a private tutor and as a teacher at the Philanthropin School of the Jewish community in Frankfurt. He also taught at the Musterschule. He frequently wrote literary reviews for various newspapers.

In 1906 he published his play Saul: ein Trauerspiel in fünf Akten ("Saul: a Tragedy in Five Acts"). Other dramatic works included Lieder eines Narren ("A Fool’s Songs") and Der Halling: Oper in drei Akten ("The Halling: Opera in Three Acts"). He wrote poetry, but it was never published.
