= Musterschule =

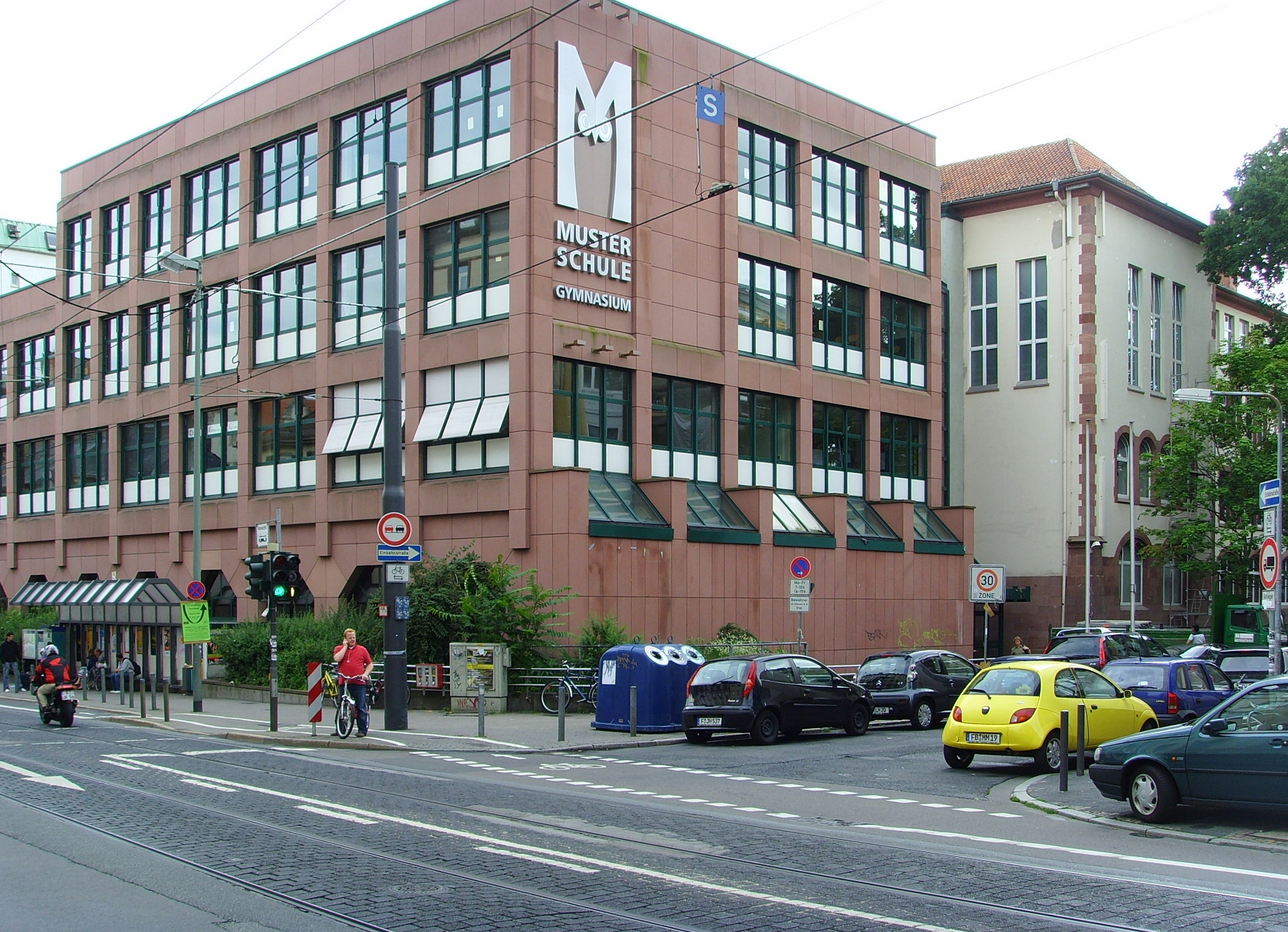

Location
- Oberweg 5–9; Frankfurt; Germany
- Coordinates: 50°7′19″N 8°41′8″E

Information
- School type: Gymnasium
- Founded: 18 April 1803; 223 years ago
- Language: German
- Campus: Urban
- Website: musterschule.de

The Musterschule ("model school") is a gymnasium in Frankfurt, Germany. It was founded on 18 April 1803 by Wilhelm Friedrich Hufnagel as a Realschule and is Frankfurt's second oldest higher school after the Lessing Gymnasium. It received the name Musterschule due to being an experimental and progressive school based on Johann Heinrich Pestalozzi's educational ideas. In accordance with this tradition, the school has been named a "center for music education and gifted education" by the Hessian ministry of culture. Since the 19th century, it has been renowned throughout Germany and abroad as a progressive Realgymnasium. The Musterschule is a neighbour of the Philanthropin, the renowned Jewish school founded by Mayer Amschel Rothschild, which is found on the other side of Eckenheimer Landstraße.

== History ==
The school was founded as a private school, after Wilhelm Friedrich Hufnagel, Friedrich Maximilian von Günderrode and Simon Moritz von Bethmann had collected funds for this purpose. Its first teacher was Friedrich Vertraugott Klitscher (1772–1809), a supporter of Pestalozzi. The school initially had nine pupils and was located in Rotkreuzgasse–6. From its foundation the school was coeducational and thus had both male and female pupils. The initial tuition fee was 15 Gulden, from 1807 25 Gulden.

In 1805 Klitscher was succeeded by Friedrich Wilhelm August Fröbel as the school's head teacher. In 1806 the school moved to Große Friedberger Gasse. As of 1805, the school had 130 pupils, as of 1812 it had 350 pupils and as of 1819 it had 555 pupils, including 212 girls. In 1819 the Musterschule became a state school in the then independent city-state of Frankfurt, and its teachers became state officials.

The school was located in the Mauerweg, in the buildings of the current Klingerschule, from 1880 to 1901. In 1901 the school moved to its current location in Frankfurt-Nordend. The Philanthropin, Frankfurt's most renowned Jewish school, shortly after moved into a neighbouring building across the street. The Musterschule also had a high proportion of Jewish pupils, around 20%, until the 1930s when they were gradually forced out by the Nazis. Most of them belonged to families who had been living in Frankfurt for an extended period of time.

The school has a close cooperation with the Hoch Conservatory and with the Elisabethenschule, a gymnasium formed in 1876 as a higher girls' school from the girls' department of the Musterschule.

== Notable teachers ==
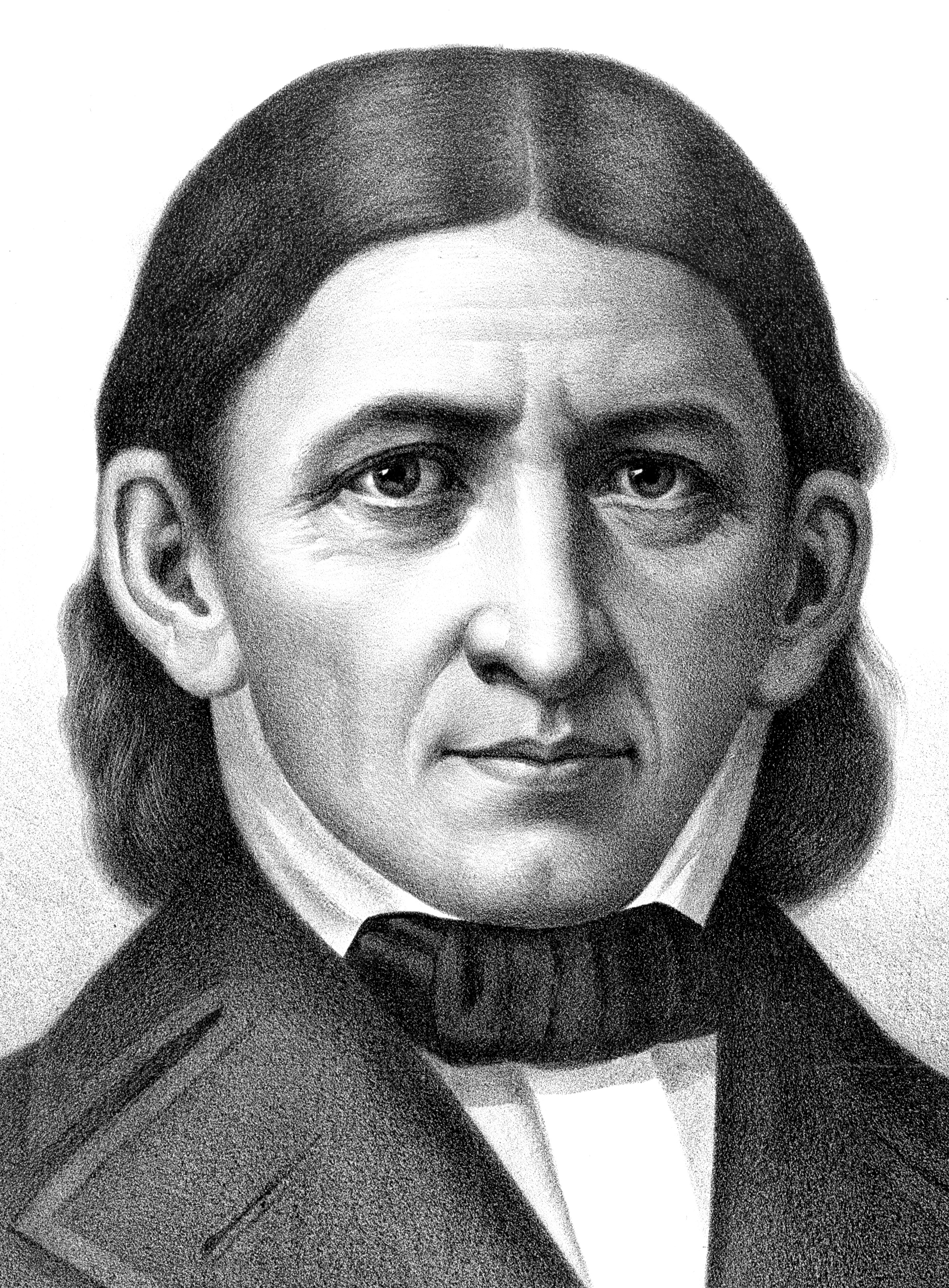
Friedrich Fröbel

- Friedrich Vertraugott Klitscher (teacher 1803–1809)
- Heinrich Wilhelm Seel (director from 1810)
- Anton Kirchner (teacher 1804–1807)
- Friedrich Wilhelm August Fröbel (teacher 1805/1811)
- Adolph Diesterweg (teacher 1811–1820)
- Georg Hassel (teacher 1818–1821)
- Wilhelm Heinrich Ackermann (teacher 1820–1847)
- Carl Kühner (teacher 1851–1867)
- Gustav Weinberg
- Eduard Ziehen (teacher 1925–1945)

== Alumni ==
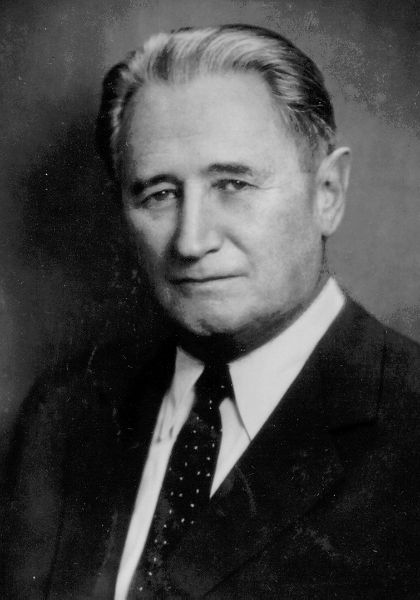
Nachum Goldman

- Rudolf Jung (1859–1922), historian
- Arthur von Weinberg (1860–1943), industrialist and honorary citizen of Frankfurt
- Theodor Ziehen (1862–1950), psychiatrist and philosopher
- Julius Ziehen (1864–1925), pedagogue
- Franziska Braun (born 1885), first regular female student at the TH Darmstadt (1908–1912)
- Ludwig Hirschfeld Mack (1893–1965), painter
- Nahum Goldmann (1894–1982), founder and president of the World Jewish Congress
- Ernst Fraenkel (1898–1975), political scientist
- Ernst von Salomon (1902–1972), author
- Wolfgang Abendroth (1906–1985), political scientist
- Armin K.W. Kutzsche (1914–1995), bacteriologist
- Herbert Hess (born 1933), jazz musician
- Dieter Bartetzko (born 1949), editor of Frankfurter Allgemeine Zeitung
- Tobias Utter (born 1962), CDU politician
- Stephan Zind (born 1964), pianist and co-founder of the Frankfurt Music Academy
- Etienne Gardé (born 1978), TV presenter
- Hila Bronstein (born 1983), singer, known as a member of Bro'Sis

== Literature ==
- Festschrift zur Hundertjahrfeier der Musterschule (Musterschule und Elisabethenschule) in Frankfurt a. Main 1803–1903. Frankfurt, 1903
- Max Walter: Erziehung der Schüler zur Selbstverwaltung am Reform-Realgymnasium "Musterschule" Frankfurt am Main, Weidmann, Berlin, 1919
- Peter Müller (ed.): Vom Werden, Wirken und Wesen der Musterschule zu Frankfurt a. M.: Festgabe zum 125jährigen Jubiläum 1803–1928
- Kuno Banholzer (ed.): Festschrift des Realgymnasiums Musterschule zur 150-Jahrfeier 1803–1953. Rauch, Frankfurt, 1953
- Dieter Kallus, Eberhard Aulmann (ed.): Musterschule 1803–2003: Festschrift zum 200-jährigen Bestehen des Gymnasiums in Frankfurt am Main, Frankfurt, 2003
