= Raymond Rodgers Belmont =

American polo player

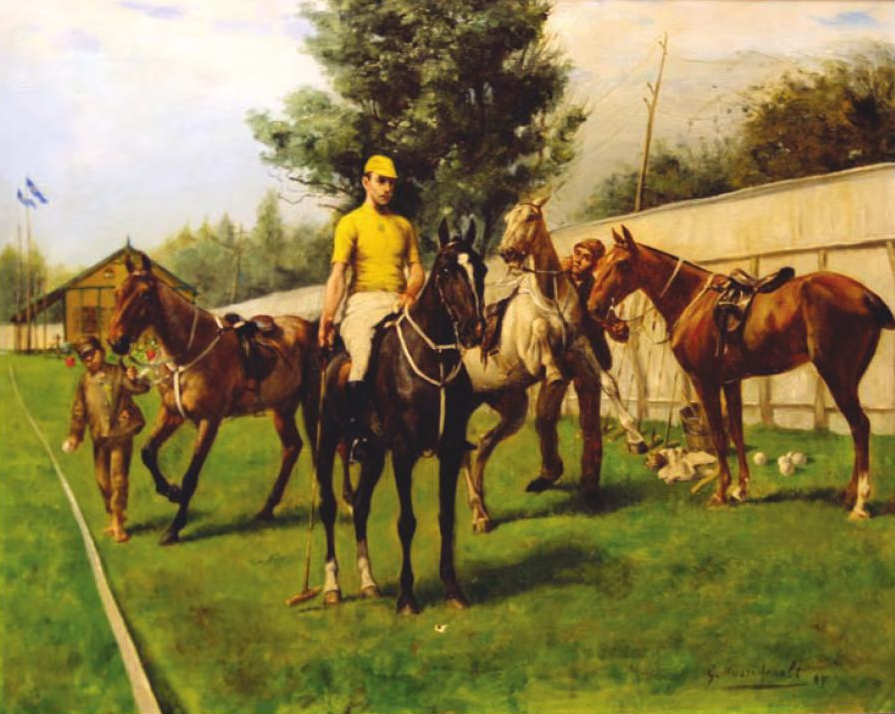
Raymond Rodgers Belmont on Domino circa 1880 painted by Gustav Muss-Arnolt

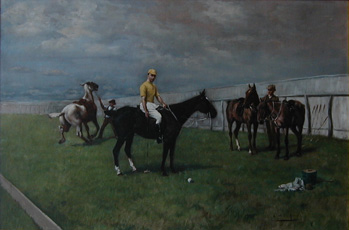
Raymond Rodgers Belmont on Domino by Gustav Muss-Arnolt in 1880

Raymond Rodgers Belmont (July 19, 1863 – January 31, 1887) was a champion polo player who killed himself in 1887 with a gunshot.

== Biography ==
He was born on July 19, 1863, to August Belmont and Caroline Slidell Mackenzie Perry. He attended Harvard University.

He participated in the 1886 International Polo Cup with teammates William Knapp Thorn, Foxhall Parker Keene and Thomas Hitchcock, Sr.

He died on January 31, 1887, in New York City by shooting himself in the side of the head with a pistol. He was 23 years old. He was buried in the Common Burying Ground and Island Cemetery in Newport, Rhode Island.
