= John Hall-Dalwood =

British soldier and police officer

Lieutenant-Colonel John Hall-Dalwood CBE

Chief Constable of Sheffield City Police
- In office January 1913 – March 1926

Chief Constable of Leicester City Police
- In office 1907 – January 1913

Deputy Chief Constable of Kent County Constabulary
- In office 1902–1907

Personal details
- Born: 19 September 1868 Sherborne, Dorset, England
- Died: 5 March 1954 (aged 85) Worthing, Sussex, England

Lieutenant-Colonel John Hall-Dalwood CBE (19 September 1868 – 5 March 1954) was a British soldier and police officer who served as Chief Constable of Sheffield City Police.

Hall-Dalwood was born in Sherborne, Dorset, in 1868, the son of a chemist and druggist. He was commissioned into the Connaught Rangers, in which he served for fifteen years; after leaving the Regular Army he joined the Territorial Army and went on to command the 6th Battalion, West Yorkshire Regiment. He was also a qualified barrister. After leaving the Army he joined the Royal Irish Constabulary, and was appointed Deputy Chief Constable of Kent County Constabulary in 1902 and Chief Constable of Leicester City Police in 1907. In January 1913 he was appointed Chief Constable of Sheffield. His career was brought to an end by the Sheffield Gang Wars; in March 1926 he was pressurised into resigning by the local Watch Committee, which did not consider he had done enough to control the violence.

He was appointed Commander of the Order of the British Empire (CBE) in the 1920 civilian war honours.

He died in Worthing, Sussex, in 1954.

Police appointments
Preceded by Charles Scott	Chief Constable of Sheffield; 1913–1926	Succeeded by Percy Sillitoe
