= Moritz Julius Bonn =

German economist

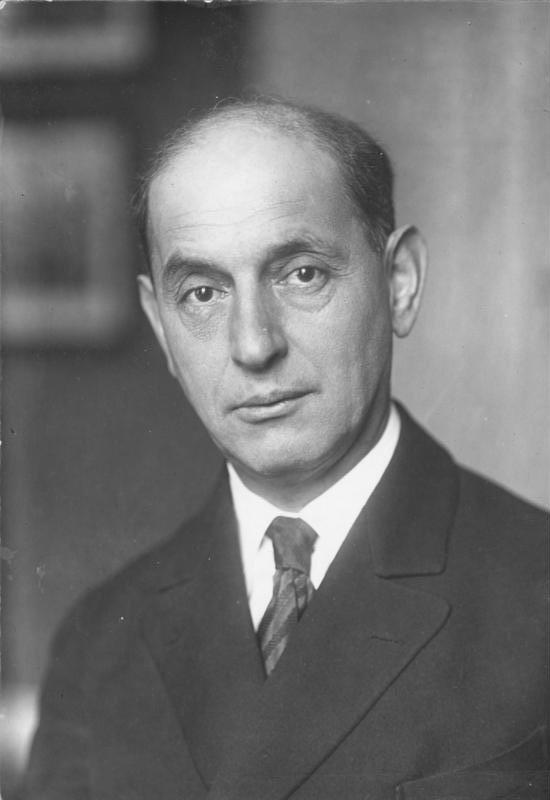
- Moritz Julius Bonn
- Born: 16 June 1873; Frankfurt am Main
- Died: 25 January 1965 (aged 91); London
- Occupations: Economist, author
- Scientific career
- Fields: Economics

Moritz Julius Bonn (16 June 1873 – 25 January 1965) was a German economist, academic and university professor.

== Biography ==
He was born on 16 June 1873 in Frankfurt am Main as son of the banker Julius Philipp Bonn and Elise Brunner of Hohenems.

He died in London on 25 January 1965.

== Education ==
He studied economics at Heidelberg University, the Ludwig-Maximilians-Universität München, and the University of Vienna.

In 1905, he completed his habilitation on English colonial rule in Ireland.

== Career ==
From 1914 to 1917, he taught at various universities in the United States.

As a political consultant, he took part in numerous postwar conferences.

== Bibliography ==
He is the author of a number of notable books:

- The Crisis Of European Democracy - The Crisis Of European Democracy
- Modern Ireland and her agrarian problem - Modern Ireland and her agrarian problem
- Die Neugestaltung unserer kolonialen Aufgaben. Festrede, geh. bei der Akademischen Feier der Handelshochschule München anlässlich des 90. Geburtsfestes - Die Neugestaltung unserer kolonialen Aufgaben. Festrede, geh. bei der Akademischen Feier der Handelshochschule München anlässlich des 90. Geburtsfestes [...] des Prinzregenten Luitpold von Bayern am [...] 7. März 1911

== See also ==
- World War I reparations
- Political economy
