= August Belmont =

United States banker, financier and diplomat (1813–1890)

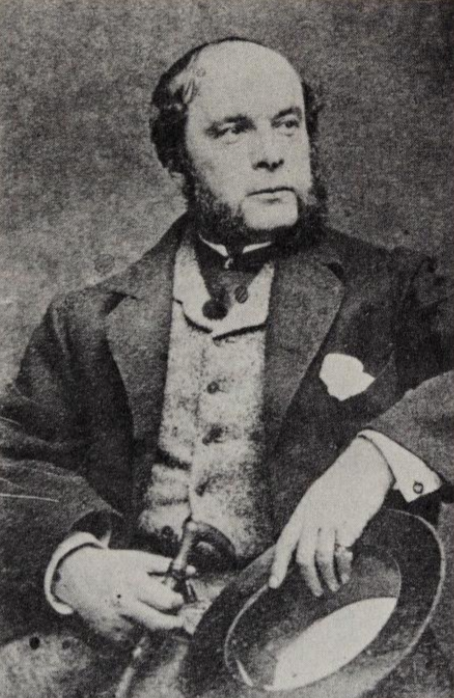
- Belmont c. 1860–1872

Chair of the Democratic National Committee
- In office June 23, 1860 – 1872
- Preceded by: David Allen Smalley
- Succeeded by: Augustus Schell

United States Minister to the Netherlands
- In office October 11, 1853 – September 22, 1857
- Preceded by: George Folsom
- Succeeded by: Henry C. Murphy

Personal details
- Born: Aaron Schönberg; December 8, 1813 Alzey, Mont-Tonnerre, French Empire
- Died: November 24, 1890 (aged 76) Manhattan, New York, U.S.
- Resting place: Island Cemetery, Newport, Rhode Island
- Spouse: Caroline Slidell Perry (m. 1849)
- Children: 6, including Perry, August Jr., Oliver, Raymond
- Parents: Simon Belmont; Frederika Elsass
- Occupation: Financier, politician, diplomat, racehorse owner/breeder
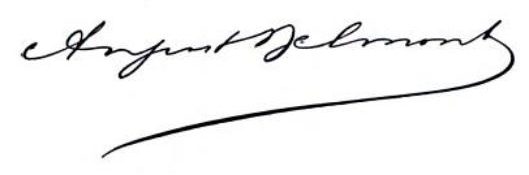
- Signature

August Belmont Sr. (born Aron Belmont; December 8, 1813 – November 24, 1890) was a German-American financier, diplomat, and Democratic Party politician. As chair of the Democratic National Committee from 1860 to 1872, during a period of turmoil and reconciliation for the party following the American Civil War, Belmont was one of the longest serving party leaders in American history. During his life, he was one of the wealthiest men in the United States. He was also a thoroughbred racehorse owner and the founder and namesake of the Belmont Stakes, the third leg of the Triple Crown of American Thoroughbred horse racing.

Belmont was born in the Grand Duchy of Hesse in 1813 to a leading Jewish family. After attending the Philanthropin, he joined the Rothschild banking house as an apprentice and clerk. In 1837, en route to Cuba to stabilize Rothschild holdings following the First Carlist War, Belmont stopped in New York City during a catastrophic financial panic and learned that the Rothschilds' American agent had collapsed. Acting on his own judgment, he established himself as the house's American agent, a position which rapidly elevated him to the top of New York society.

Through his wife Caroline Slidell Perry and her uncle, John Slidell, Belmont became involved in the Democratic Party as a major donor and organizer in 1844, the same year he was naturalized as a United States citizen. In 1853, Belmont was appointed as United States minister to the Netherlands by Franklin Pierce. His diplomatic career was controversial for his roles in the Ostend Manifesto, calling for the American acquisition of Cuba, and the Walter M. Gibson affair. Although Belmont was a leading supporter of James Buchanan in his presidential campaigns in both 1852 and 1856, Buchanan did not appoint Belmont to any position in his administration, and Belmont supported Stephen A. Douglas for the party's nomination in 1860.

When the Democratic Party split between its northern and southern wings in 1860, Belmont became chair of the northern (or national) wing, leading its campaign against Abraham Lincoln. His plan to create anti-Lincoln fusion tickets in key swing states failed, and Lincoln was elected, leading to the American Civil War.

== Early life ==
He was born as Aron Belmont on December 8, 1813, to a Jewish family in the village of Alzey, which was shortly annexed to the Grand Duchy of Hesse after the Napoleonic Wars. His father, Simon Belmont (Note: He was known by the patronym Simon Isaac until 1808, when Napoleon ordered all Jews in France and its German territories to take surnames. He chose Belmont, French for 'beautiful mountain'; in German, the name translated as Schönberg.) was the owner of a freehold estate and leading citizen of Alzey, serving as president of the local synagogue for many years. His paternal ancestors were Spanish Jews who fled the Iberian peninsula during the reign of Ferdinand and Isabella. At a young age, his parents began calling him August, the name he used throughout his life. His mother, Frederika Elsass Belmont, died when August was seven.

After his mother's death, he lived with his uncle and grandmother in Frankfurt, where he attended the Philanthropin, a school founded by Mayer Amschel Rothschild, designed to integrate the city's Jewish and Christian communities. When he was fifteen, he was forced to withdraw from the Philanthropin after his father failed to pay tuition. His relatives prevailed upon the Rothschild family, who were relatives by marriage of his grandmother and already leading European financiers, to train him for business. While training as an apprentice and running errands, he was tutored in French, English, composition, and arithmetic. In 1832, his training was rewarded with an appointment as confidential clerk; two years later, he became secretary and traveling companion to one of the firm's partners, which led to his first trip outside Germany to Paris, Naples, and the Vatican City.

== Business career ==
In 1837, the Rothschild branches in Paris and London became concerned with their holdings in the Spanish Empire, which had been destabilized by the Carlist War. They sent Belmont to sail for Cuba via New York City. Reaching New York amid the Panic of 1837, he learned that the Rothschilds' American agent, J.L. and S.I. Joseph & Co., had collapsed under liabilities of $7 million. As the situation called for a response from Europe more rapid than communications technology permitted, Belmont acted on his own judgment to postpone his trip to Cuba and superintend the Rothschild interests in New York, establishing August Belmont & Co. at 78 Wall Street. The Rothschilds eventually approved his decision, making him their permanent agent in the United States.

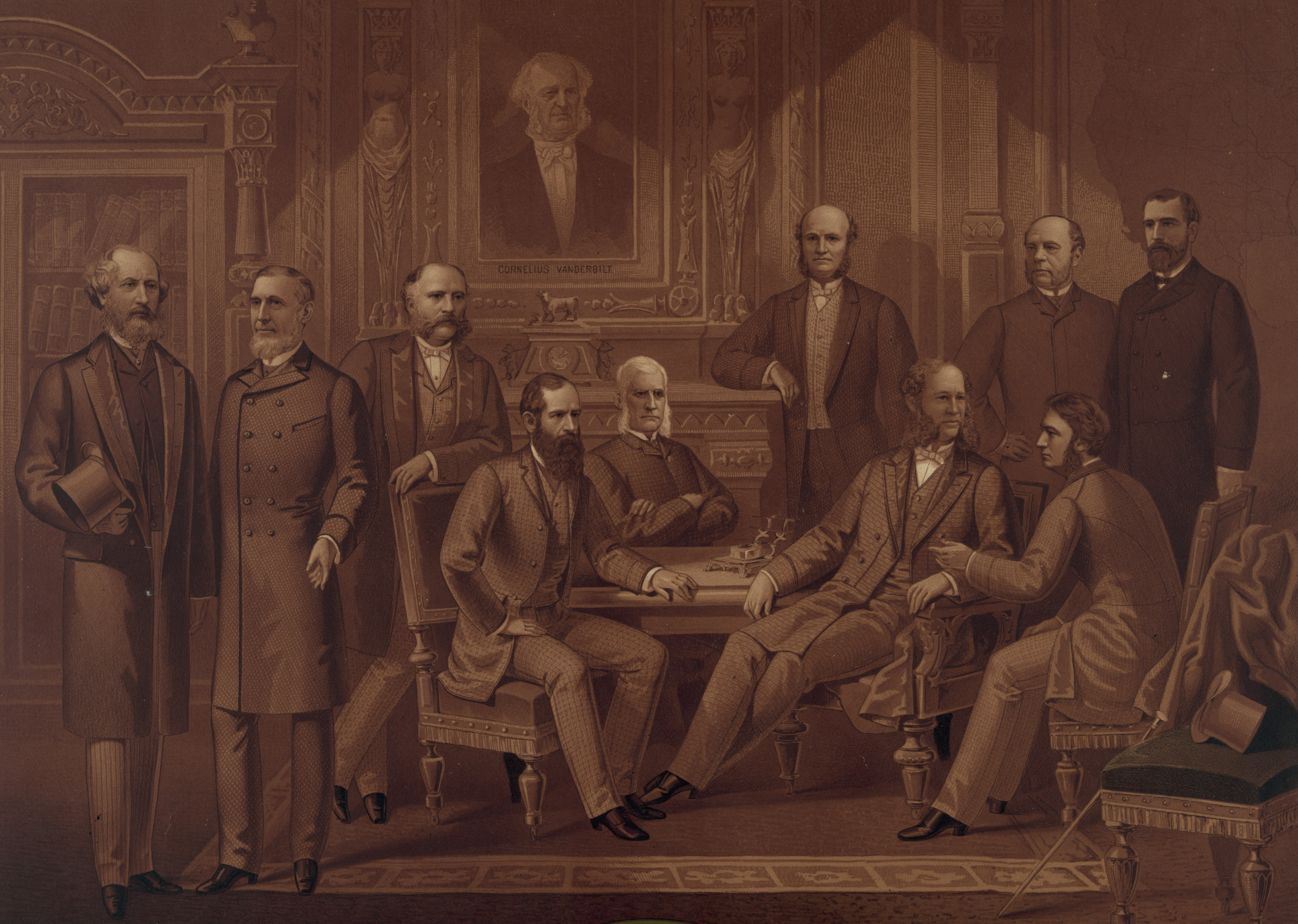
The Kings of Wall Street, an 1882 print of Belmont standing, second from right. The others, left to right: Cyrus W. Field, Russell Sage, Rufus Hatch, Jay Gould, Sidney Dillon, D. O. Mills, William Henry Vanderbilt, George Wm. Ballou, and James R. Keene.

=== August Belmont & Company ===
From 1837 to 1842, Belmont experienced instantaneous success, serving as disbursing agent, dividend collector, and newsgatherer for the Rothschilds and their customers. The new financial house also invested in foreign exchange markets, commercial and private loans, commercial paper, and handled deposits. Belmont's European connections attracted private investment from corporations, railroads, and state and local governments. In the wake of the Panic of 1837, Belmont was able to use Rothschild credit to buy up wildcat bank notes, securities, commodities, and property at severely depressed rates, sometimes as low as ten cents to the dollar. Using early modern securitization techniques, he was a pioneer on Wall Street, rapidly shifting money and commodities in complex international spirals of credit New York City had not seen before. He was also considered a skilled arbitrageur, earning him the nickname "King of the Money Changers." Within three years of his arrival in the city, he had amassed a personal fortune of $100,000 ($3,123,002 in 2025), making him one of the richest men in New York and one of the three most important private bankers in the United States. He was still only twenty-six.

In the later half of the 1840s, Belmont's autonomy from the Rothschilds grew, and their relationship declined somewhat. In 1847, the United States government granted Belmont & Co. the right to transfer $3 million to Mexico as part of an indemnity paid for land seized in the Mexican-American War. He handled the transaction without taking a commission, hoping to generate goodwill with the government. However, when the government sought a $5 million loan soon after, Belmont won only half the amount he had bid in syndication with Corcoran & Riggs. When he further lent the new California Territory 5 million pesos, the Rothschilds hinted they might publicly dissociate the transaction and discredit Belmont, but ultimately did not. When Belmont was tasked with mentoring Alphonse James de Rothschild on a visit to America in 1849, he privately told his sister he feared he was training his replacement; Alphonse ultimately returned to Europe to lead the family's Parisian holdings.

During Belmont's time abroad as a diplomat in the Netherlands, the business was operated by Charles Christmas and Erhard A. Matthiessen under the name Christmas, Matthiessen & Company.

== Diplomatic and early political career ==
Belmont was a lifelong member of the Democratic Party who first engaged in political campaigning in 1844, the same year he was naturalized as a citizen, by supporting James K. Polk for president in the hotly contested presidential election. The same year, he became the consul general of the Austrian Empire in New York City, representing the Habsburg family in diplomatic matters throughout the Mid-Atlantic States. He resigned the position in 1850 over objections to the regime's policies towards Hungary, which had become a major cause célèbre in the United States, and his growing interest in American politics.

=== 1852 presidential campaign ===
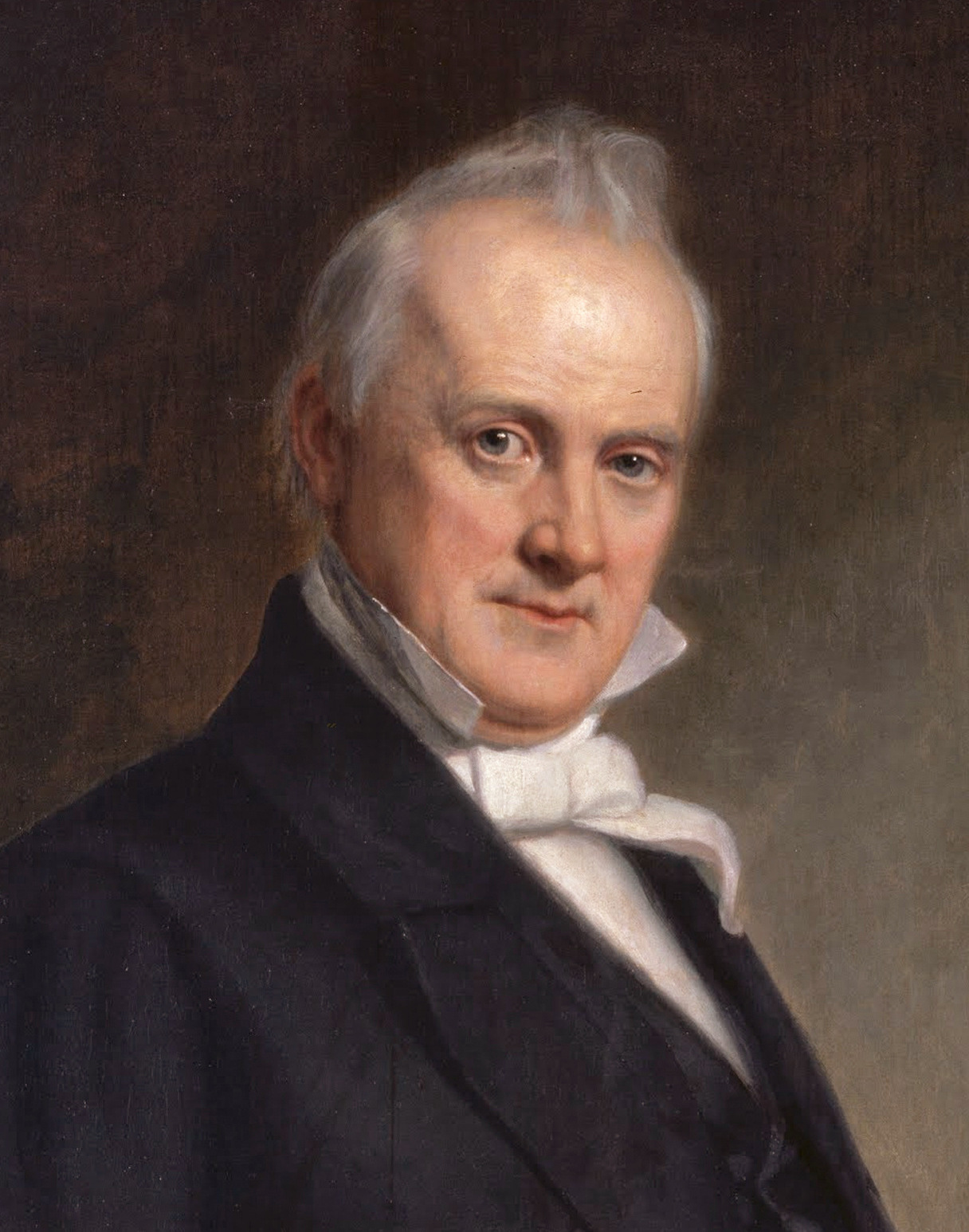
Belmont entered politics as a leading supporter of James Buchanan for president in 1852 and 1856.

Around 1849, Belmont met John Slidell, a leading member of the Democratic Party in Louisiana, through the Union Club of the City of New York. By 1850, Slidell encouraged Belmont to enter politics. Belmont had voted for Democratic candidates since his naturalization in 1844, although most of his business acquaintances were nominal or active Whigs.

With Slidell, Belmont backed the nomination of former United States Secretary of State James Buchanan for president in 1852, hoping to unite New York in a coalition with the South. To avoid the appearance of Southern interference, Slidell chose Belmont to manage the New York campaign. At the time, New York Democrats were deeply divided into various factions over slavery, with anti-slavery "Barnburners" having bolted in 1848 to support the Free Soil Party candidacy of Martin Van Buren. Throughout 1851 and the spring of 1852, Belmont and Slidell worked to rally the factions to Buchanan, including by the purchase of the New York Morning Star newspaper, but they failed to overcome favorite son William L. Marcy or Lewis Cass in the New York delegation. Efforts to unite behind Marcy or Stephen A. Douglas at the 1852 Democratic National Convention also failed; Franklin Pierce was nominated as an unexpected dark horse. Belmont lent financial and political support to Pierce's campaign, bringing sustained attack from the city's Whig newspapers, which accused Belmont of using "Jew gold" from abroad to buy votes and maintaining "dual allegiance" to the Habsburg and Rothschild families. Belmont demanded a retraction of at least one Tribune story, but after he was rebuffed by Horace Greeley, he enlisted the Democratic Herald and Evening Post in his defense. The journalistic war of words became known within New York City as the "Belmont affair."

=== Minister to the Netherlands (1853–57) ===
Pierce won the 1852 election easily and appointed Buchanan and Belmont to diplomatic posts in the United Kingdom and the Netherlands, respectively. Belmont held the title of Chargé d'Affaires at The Hague from October 11, 1853, until September 26, 1854, when the position's title was changed to Minister Resident. He continued as Minister Resident until September 22, 1857. In this role, Belmont successfully negotiated two treaties with the Dutch government: a new commercial treaty permitting American access to the Dutch East Indies in 1855 and an extradition treaty in 1857.

==== Ostend Manifesto ====
Shortly after Pierce's election, Belmont proposed to Buchanan a plan to purchase and annex Cuba through military and diplomatic pressure on the unstable Kingdom of Spain, along with financial pressure from the Rothschilds and other European banking houses which held Spanish government bonds and could threaten the government with bankruptcy. In the letter, Belmont proposed that President-elect Pierce could, through his ministers to London and the Bourbon monarchies in Paris and Naples, create a diplomatic climate favorable to Spanish capitulation. For Naples, he recommended himself; Buchanan endorsed the plan and proposed it to Pierce, omitting Belmont's name. Belmont proposed the plan again to William Marcy upon learning that Marcy would become Secretary of State, adding that he was on good terms with the lover of Maria Christina of the Two Sicilies. He continued to lobby Buchanan, Marcy, and Pierce, directly and through friends, for the appointment to Naples, but it was ultimately given to Robert Dale Owen, and Belmont reluctantly accepted appointment to The Hague.

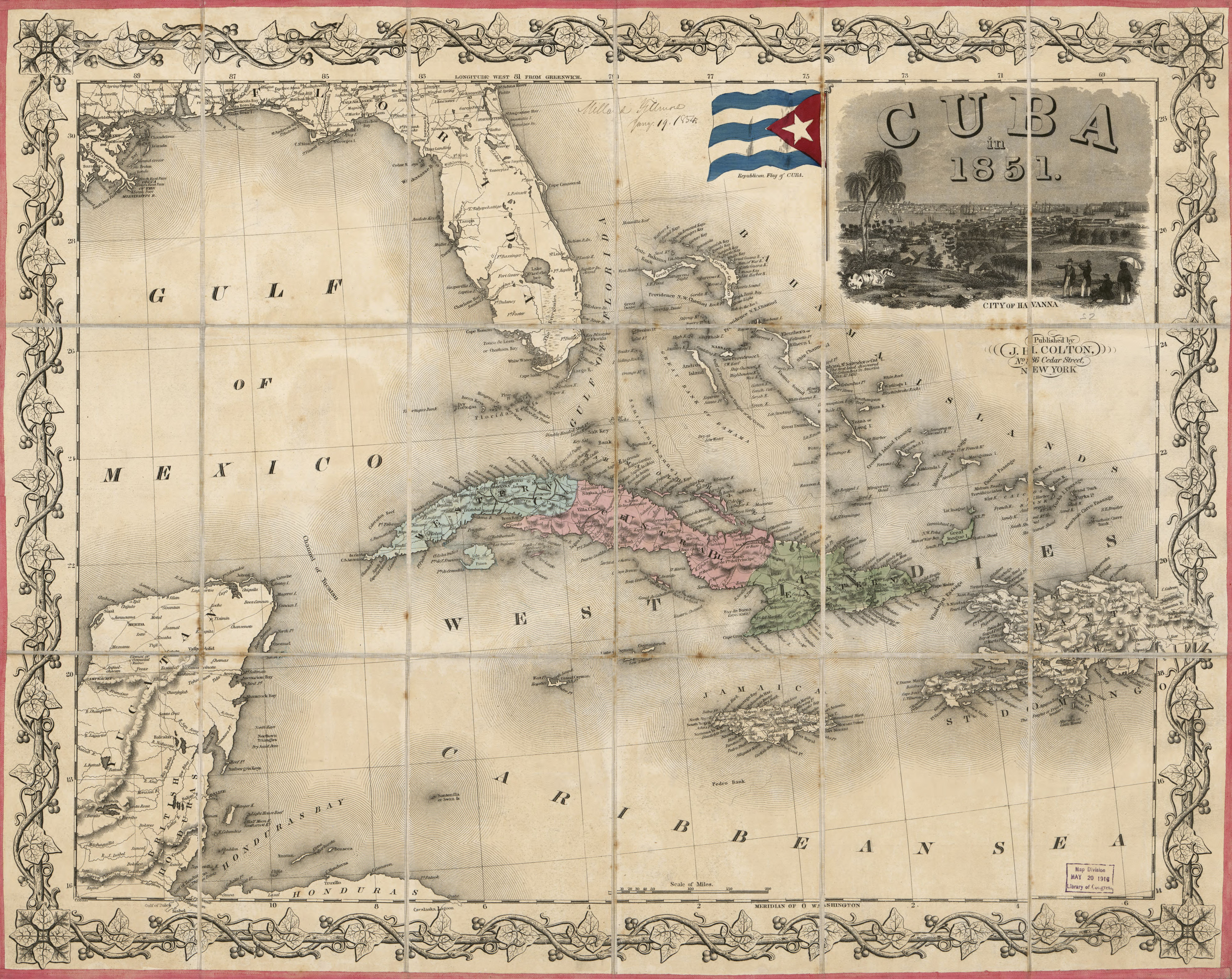
Belmont was an aggressive advocate for the annexation of Cuba, proposing a plan to pressure Spain into giving up the island which included diplomatic pressure, financial leverage, and bribery. His lobbying eventually led to the Ostend Manifesto.

En route to The Hague, Belmont visited Buchanan and Lionel de Rothschild in London and "several gentlemen of influence" in Madrid. He reported to Washington that Spain was unstable and desperate for financial relief, but also proposed rebellion in Cuba as an alternative to a direct sale, if blocked by "Castilian pride." In October 1853, Belmont requested from Marcy a "secret fund of $40,000 to $50,000" to bribe Spanish officials to support Cuban independence, and he opened backchannel negotiations with the Spanish Minister to The Netherlands, a personal friend who favored the sale. However, Spain–United States relations soured quickly, driven by the bellicosity of Pierre Soulé, the United States Minister to Spain, and the Spanish Revolution of 1854, which installed a government less disposed to sell Cuba. Under sustained pressure from Belmont and other expansionists, President Pierce proposed that Buchanan, Soulé, and John Y. Mason (the three leading American diplomats in Europe) deliver a report on the Belmont plan. Though Slidell proposed that Belmont participate "on account of the Rothschild influence at Madrid and Paris," he was not present at their meeting in Ostend, Belgium on October 9, 1854. Their report to Secretary Marcy, which favored an invasion of Cuba in the even that Spain refused to sell the island, became known as the Ostend Manifesto. The Manifesto was swiftly doomed by its leak to the New York Herald and the victory of Pierce's opponents in the 1854 elections.

==== Gibson affair ====
As chargé d'affaires, Belmont was tasked with negotiating a trade agreement which would allow American shipping in the Dutch East Indies; his efforts were diverted by an international incident over the arrest of American citizen and adventurer Walter M. Gibson for fomenting rebellion in the East Indies. Gibson had been arrested in 1851 for conspiring with the Sultan of Djambi to overthrow Dutch authority on the island of Sumatra. After he was acquitted on a technicality, the Dutch Minister of Justice overturned the colonial court's decision and sentenced him to twelve years imprisonment. Gibson fled the East Indies for Washington, where he arrived in 1853 and appealed to the Pierce administration for protection. He also sought support in pursuing an indemnity claim against the Dutch government for his arrest and destruction of his ship. Secretary Marcy and American public opinion backed Gibson.

After initial resistance from the Dutch foreign ministry, the affair was inflamed in summer 1854 when Gibson, impatient with the State Department's handling of the case, arrived in The Hague personally to pursue his claims, falsely representing himself to Belmont as a special diplomatic agent appointed by Marcy. Gibson's presence undermined Belmont's negotiating position and riled Dutch public opinion, which demanded he be arrested as a fugitive from justice. Belmont's position was further weakened when he left the city for the mineral baths in Bohemia, citing rheumatism. While Belmont was on leave, Gibson stole his dossier on the case and left for Paris, where he further told American minister John Y. Mason that Belmont had appointed him special attaché. Gibson in turn represented himself around Paris as Mason's first secretary, leaking stories to Horace Greeley's New York Tribune which attacked Pierce's foreign policy by suggesting that Belmont utilized his diplomatic post as a banking house and was underwriting the Russian Empire in the Crimean War.

Though Marcy thereafter dropped the issue and proceeded to ignore Gibson's claims, and both Marcy and President Pierce praised Belmont's handling of the affair, the entire incident did further damage to Belmont's public reputation in the United States. In addition to the Tribune, the Democratic New York Herald (which had turned on the Pierce administration politically, as the result of a patronage dispute) joined in antisemitic and xenophobic attacks on Belmont for the remainder of his tenure.

=== Buchanan years (1857–60) ===
While at The Hague, Belmont strengthened his ties to James Buchanan, maintaining an active and flattering correspondence with his fellow diplomat. As President Pierce's domestic popularity waned over his handling of the crisis in Kansas, Belmont expected Buchanan to be the next Democratic nominee and the likely President. Stateside, John Slidell organized members of Congress and bankers behind Buchanan for the 1856 nomination and lobbied Buchanan to resign from his post to openly stand as a candidate. He did in March 1856 and, after a visit to Belmont at The Hague, sailed home, where he was nominated and elected president. Belmont's role in the 1856 campaign was a matter of historical controversy; major accounts inaccurately imply he was in the United States, contributing thousands of dollars and planning campaign strategy. Biographer Irving Katz notes that Belmont did not return from Europe until November 1857 and, though he certainly committed money to the Buchanan campaign, no evidence exists as to an exact sum. Regardless of his exact role, he was again a subject of scrutiny and attack from the domestic press, who sought to tarnish Buchanan's image through connection to Belmont.

Though Belmont hoped to receive a promotion within the diplomatic corps, Buchanan and Lewis Cass, the new Secretary of State, offered him only another four years at The Hague; he declined and resigned his post. When he arrived in the United States, he found his party embroiled in a feud between President Buchanan and Senator Stephen Douglas, who denounced the proslavery Lecompton Constitution for the Kansas Territory, which Buchanan supported. Belmont, who considered Douglas a personal friend and the likely Democratic nominee in 1860, nevertheless publicly endorsed Buchanan's stance in 1858, circulating a petition which urged Congress to admit Kansas into the Union as a slave state and defending the administration against "'Black' Republicans and Know-Nothings" in an Independence Day speech at Tammany Hall.

In 1858, Belmont lobbied to succeed Augustus C. Dodge as Minister to Spain, but his request was ignored by the White House, in part because Buchanan hoped to appoint John Slidell as Minister to France and felt he could not appoint both men to prominent posts. The decision has also been attributed to Belmont's role in the Ostend Manifesto, which made him unsuitable for the sensitive post. The snub agitated Belmont, who broke with the administration permanently, and then broke with his wife's uncle Slidell, after Slidell refused to relay an angry letter from Belmont to the President. Belmont's switch from Buchanan to Douglas drew him into the more moderate "Softshell" faction of the New York party, which favored a pluralist, democratic approach on the issue of slavery. In October 1859, he joined with Samuel J. Tilden and others to organize the Democratic Vigilant Association, a predominantly mercantile group (especially those engaged in trade with the South) to combat "atrocious disunion doctrines," including the abolition of slavery.

== Chairman of the Democratic National Committee ==
=== 1860 conventions and election ===
Belmont was elected as a delegate to the 1860 Democratic National Convention. As before, Belmont's presence in the Douglas coalition drew criticism, with placards claiming "the Rothschilds have sent countless millions" to buy the presidency. Even some Douglas supporters opposed Belmont, with Fernando Wood claiming that Belmont intended to betray the Senator, given his connections to Buchanan and Slidell. Belmont allayed any fears in a meeting with Douglas allies and ultimately became leader of the Douglas men in the New York delegation, a pivotal position at the convention.

Belmont attended the April convention in Charleston with his family and Salomon James de Rothschild as his guest. The convention descended into chaos over the party's position on slavery, was disbanded, and was rescheduled for Baltimore six weeks later. In the meantime, Belmont advised Douglas on campaign strategy and gained the candidate's support for a resolution to protect the rights of slaveholders in the territories. Belmont also funded Douglas rallies in New York City, aiming to raise funds and keep the Northern party united behind Douglas. Douglas expressed gratitude and invited Belmont to meet in Washington in advance of the Baltimore convention, where Douglas was easily nominated without Southern participation. Belmont was selected as to represent New York on the Democratic National Committee and then elevated as the Committee's chairman; he would serve in the role for over a decade. Douglas biographer George F. Milton wrote, "the Committee hoped [Belmont] could smite the Manhattan rock and cause campaign funds to flow." Belmont biographer Irving Katz additionally cites Belmont's "organizing ability, his immense energy, his unswerving loyalty to the Douglas standard, and his efforts to diminish intraparty friction."

Belmont is attributed with single-handedly transforming the position of party chairman from a previously honorary office to one of great political and electoral importance, creating the modern American political party's national organization.

=== American Civil War ===
Belmont energetically supported the Union cause during the Civil War as a "War Democrat" (similar to former Tennessee Senator Andrew Johnson, later installed as war governor of the Union Army-occupied seceded state), conspicuously helping U.S. Representative from Missouri Francis P. Blair raise and equip the Union Army's first predominantly German-American regiment. (Note: For more on Belmont's public contributions to the war effort, see (Belmont 1870).)

According to one version of events, Belmont also used his influence with European business and political leaders to support the Union cause in the Civil War, trying to dissuade the Rothschilds and other French bankers from lending funds or credit for military purchases to the Confederacy, and meeting personally in London with the British prime minister, Lord Palmerston, and with members of Emperor Napoleon III's French Imperial Government in Paris.

However, the evidence compiled by Mira Wilkins, in The History of Foreign Investment in the United States to 1914 (Cambridge, Harvard, 1989) tells another story. She writes: “A Confederacy loan, issued in London in 1863 and marketed in London and Paris, was oversubscribed” (p. 103). Young Salomon de Rothschild was in the United States in 1859–1861 and was captivated by the American South. He wrote home on April 28, 1961, urging the Rothschilds to use their influence to have the Confederacy recognized. He saw the North as totally at fault” (p. 677 n. 90). The Confederacy loan “was also taken up in Liverpool, Amsterdam, and Frankfurt. Stanley Chapman calls the loan to the Confederacy ‘perhaps the most audaciously successful loan of the century.’... John Slidell (the uncle of August Belmont's wife) arranged the Confederacy loan. John Slidell's daughter, Mathilde, married Baron Frederic Emile d’Erlanger who was involved in that loan; their son, Baron Emile Beaumont d’Erlanger would become the senior partner in Emile Erlanger & Co., London (based on a family tree in the Belmont Family Papers, Columbia University)” (677 n. 94). In New York, Belmont helped organize the Democratic Vigilant Association, which sought to promote unity by promising Southerners that New York businessmen would protect the rights of the South and keep free-soil members out of office.

Remaining chairman of the Democratic National Committee after the War, Belmont presided over what he called "the most disastrous epoch in the annals of the Democratic Party". As early as 1862, Belmont and Samuel Tilden bought stock in the New York World in order to mold it into a major Democratic press organ with the help of Manton M. Marble, its editor-in-chief.

According to the Chicago Tribune in 1864, Belmont was buying up Southern bonds on behalf of the Rothschilds as their agent in New York because he backed the Southern cause. Seeking to capitalize on divisions in the Republican Party at the War's end, Belmont organized new party gatherings and promoted Salmon Chase (the former United States Secretary of the Treasury since 1861, and later Chief Justice of the United States in 1864) for president in 1868, the candidate he viewed least vulnerable to charges of disloyalty to the Party during the Republican/Unionists Lincoln-Johnson Administrations, (1861–69).

=== 1868 and 1872 elections ===
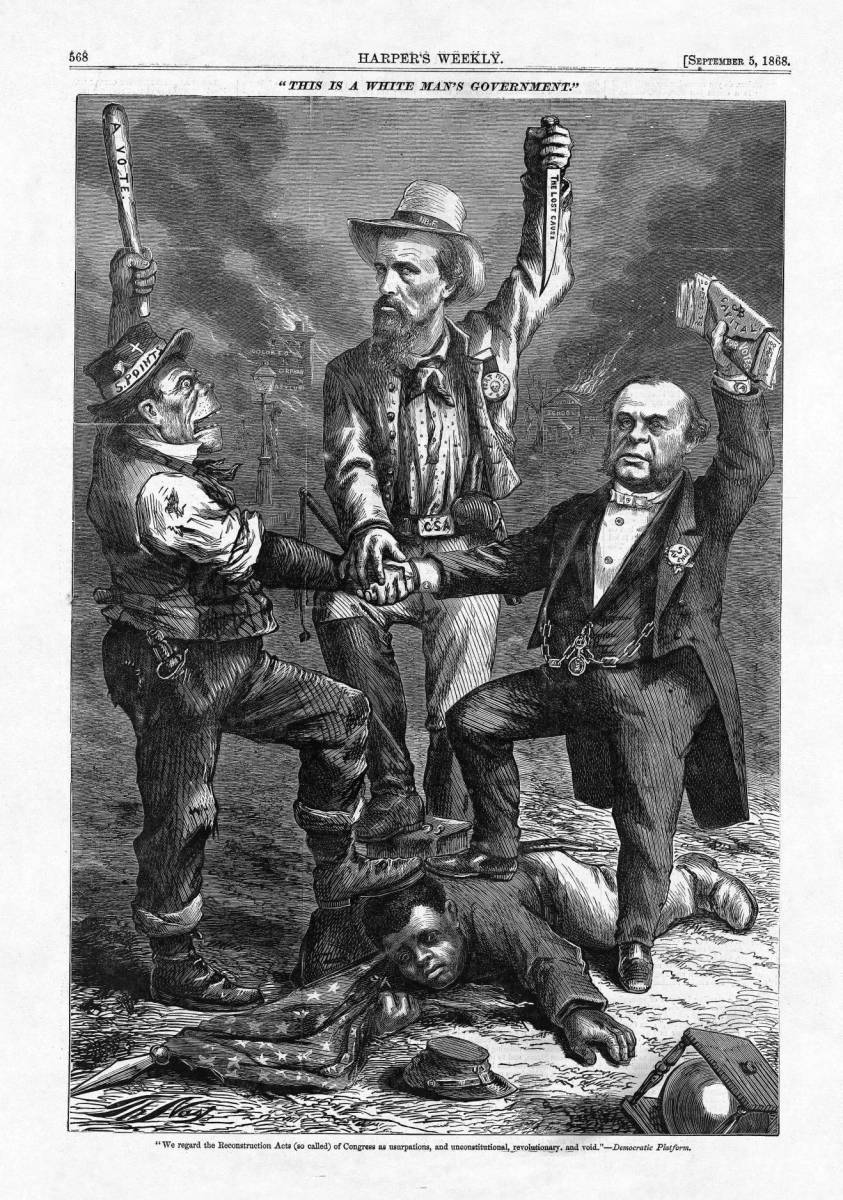
September 1868 Thomas Nast cartoon "This is a White Man's Government!" showing left to right a stereotyped Irishman (perhaps representing the Democratic Party), an ex-Confederate soldier (Nathan B. Forrest), and a capitalist (Belmont) "triumphing" over a prostrate USCT soldier on the ground.

Horatio Seymour's electoral defeat in the 1868 election paled in comparison to the later nomination of Liberal Republican Horace Greeley's disastrous 1872 presidential campaign. In 1870, the Democratic Party faced a crisis when the Committee of Seventy emerged to cleanse the government of corruption. A riot at Tammany Hall led to the campaign to topple William M. Tweed. Belmont stood by his party.

While the party chairman had originally promoted Charles Francis Adams for the nomination, Greeley's nomination implied Democratic endorsement of a candidate who as publisher of the famous nationally dominant newspaper, the New York Tribune, had often earlier referred to Democrats before, during and after the War as "slaveholders", "slave-whippers", "traitors", and "Copperheads" and accused them of "thievery, debauchery, corruption, and sin".

Although the election of 1872 prompted Belmont to resign his chairmanship of the Democratic National Committee, he nevertheless continued to dabble in politics as a champion of U.S. Senator Thomas F. Bayard of Delaware for the presidency, as a fierce critic of the process granting Rutherford B. Hayes the presidency in the 1876 election, and as an advocate of "hard money" financial policies.

== Personal life ==
As a young Jewish foreigner in New York, Belmont had few initial avenues for social advancement. The existing "Knickerbocker" elite, composed of older English-Dutch Protestants, disapproved of his extravagant lifestyle and tastes, while the established Jewish community in the city was largely Sephardic, and Belmont himself disfavored associations with the small, lower-class Ashkenazi community. His social companions were largely young rebellious men from well-to-do families; with these connections, he gradually began to introduce European cosmopolitan society to the United States. Belmont's early romantic and social life in the United States also drew controversy and opprobrium. In 1840, he unsuccessfully courted the ballerina Fanny Elssler during her sensational tour of the United States; Elssler's known reputation for promiscuity and her illegitimate child drew disapproval. In 1841, he was publicly accused of an affair with a married woman and responded by challenging the accuser to a duel, in which Belmont was shot in the hip.

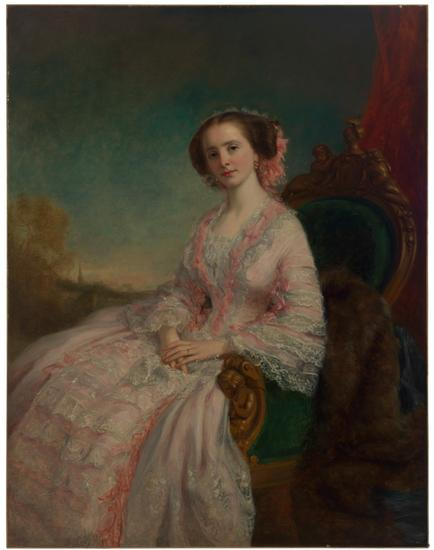
Portrait of Caroline Slidell Perry Belmont by George Peter Alexander Healy

On November 7, 1849, Belmont married Caroline Slidell Perry (1829–1892), whom he met that summer through her uncle John Slidell while vacationing at Saratoga Springs. She was the daughter of naval officer Matthew Calbraith Perry, commodore in the U.S. Navy, later famous for his expedition to Japan in 1853–1854, resulting in a treaty of peace and amity between the two countries. The two were married in an Episcopal ceremony, and he henceforth no longer acknowledged his Jewish upbringing, though he did not convert, being ambivalent toward religion.

Together, they were the parents of six children, with three of his sons becoming involved in politics:

- Perry Belmont (1851–1947), U.S. Representative from New York (1881–88) and Minister to Spain (1888–89)
- August Belmont Jr. (1853–1924)
- Jane Pauline "Jennie" Belmont (1856–1875), who died aged 19
- Fredericka Belmont (1856–1902), who married Samuel Shaw Howland (1849–1925), son of Gardiner Greene Howland
- Oliver Hazard Perry Belmont (1858–1908), U.S. Representative from New York (1901–03)
- Raymond Rodgers Belmont (1863–1887), a champion polo player

Belmont died in Manhattan, New York City on November 24, 1890, from pneumonia. His funeral was held at the Church of the Ascension in New York City.

The Letters, Speeches and Addresses of August Belmont was published at New York in 1890. Belmont left an estate valued at more than ten million dollars (equivalent to $327 million in 2025). He is buried in an ornate sarcophagus in the Belmont family plot (along with other Belmonts, Perrys and Tiffanys) in the Island Cemetery in Newport, Rhode Island. His widow died in 1892.

His home, By-the-Sea in Newport, Rhode Island, was demolished in 1946.

=== Sportsman ===
He was an avid sportsman, and the famed Belmont Stakes thoroughbred horse race is named in his honor. It debuted at Jerome Park Racetrack, owned by Belmont's friend, Leonard Jerome (the maternal grandfather of Winston Churchill). The Belmont Stakes is part of thoroughbred horse racing's Triple Crown and takes place at Belmont Park racetrack, just outside New York City. Belmont was heavily involved in Thoroughbred horse racing. He served as the president of the National Jockey Club from 1866 to 1887 and owned the Nursery Stud (a horse-breeding farm near Babylon, New York, on Long Island), which in 1885 was replaced by a stud farm of the same name near Lexington, Kentucky.

== Legacy ==
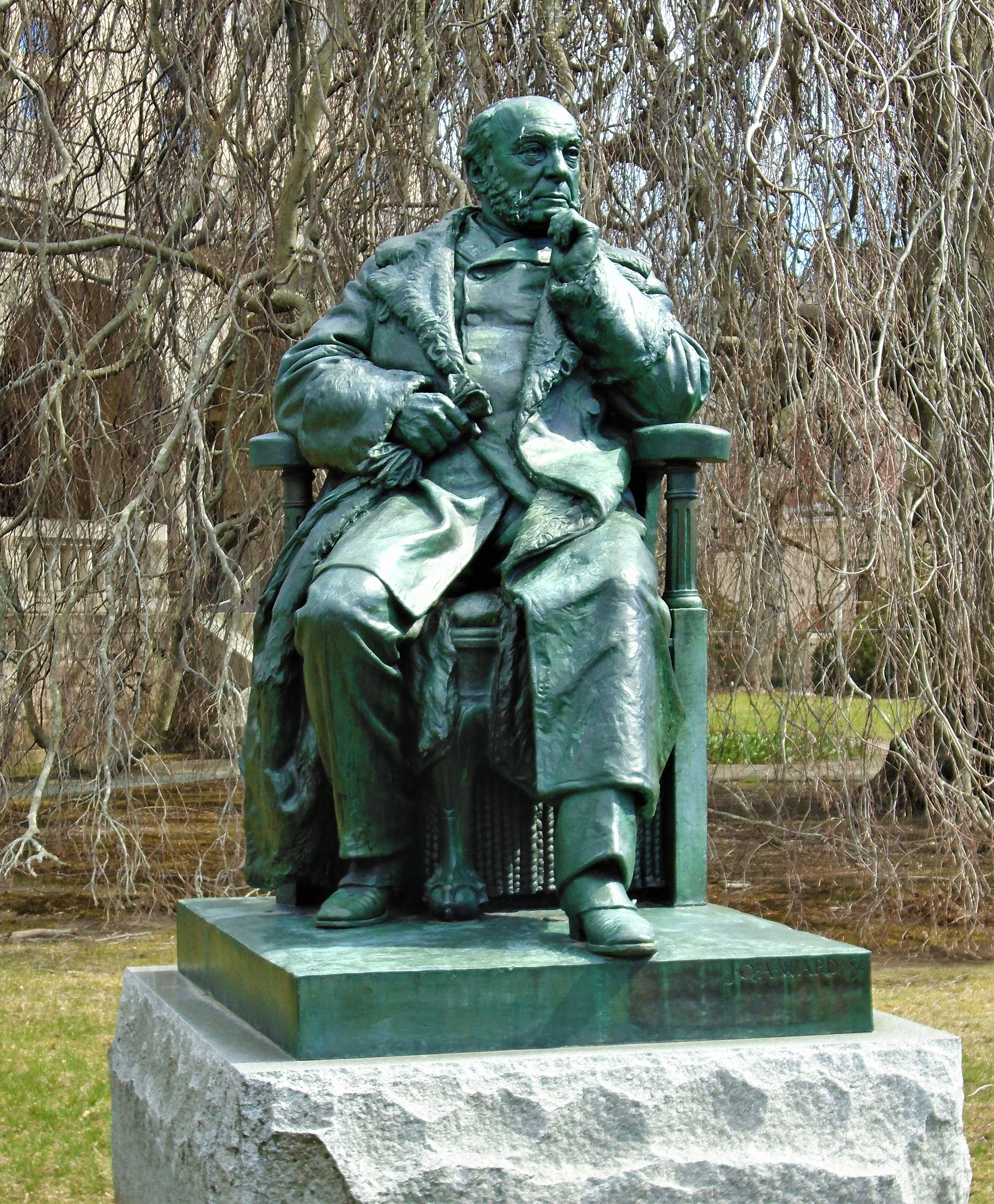
Statue of Belmont by John Quincy Adams Ward in Newport

The Liberty ship SS August Belmont and Belmont Playground in Brooklyn, New York were named in his honor.

Belmont, New Hampshire, is named in his honor, one he never acknowledged.

In 1910, sculptor John Quincy Adams Ward completed a bronze statue of a seated Belmont. The statue was originally installed in front of a small chapel adjacent to the Belmont burial plot in the Island Cemetery. It was later moved to a park between Washington Square and Touro Street in Newport. It was replaced by a marker dedicating the park as Eisenhower Park in 1960, to honor President Dwight D. Eisenhower. The statue was loaned by the city of Newport to the Metropolitan Museum of Art in New York in 1985. It was eventually installed, about 1995, in front of the headquarters building for the Preservation Society of Newport County at the corner of Bellevue and Narragansett Avenues in Newport.

== In popular culture ==
Author Edith Wharton reputedly modeled the character of Julius Beaufort in her novel The Age of Innocence on Belmont.

In The Impeachment of Abraham Lincoln by Stephen L. Carter, August Belmont appears as a character.

Diplomatic posts
Preceded by George Folsom	U.S. Minister to the Netherlands; 1853–1857	Succeeded by Henry C. Murphy
