= Netherlands–United States relations =

- Netherlands: United States

Diplomatic mission
- Dutch Embassy, Washington, D.C.: United States Embassy, The Hague

Envoy
- Ambassador Birgitta Tazelaar: Ambassador Joseph Popolo

Diplomatic relations between the Netherlands and the United States started in 1776 with the first salute at St. Eustatius's Fort Oranje and continues to this day as one of the oldest continual bilateral alliances in the western world. Today they are described as "excellent" by the United States Department of State and "close" by the Ministry of Foreign Affairs of the Netherlands. Founding members of the North Atlantic Alliance and allies since John Adams's visit to the Netherlands in 1782, it is considered one of the strongest military and economic alliances in contemporary history.

The United States and the Netherlands work together both bilaterally and multilaterally in such institutions as the United Nations, World Trade Organization, the Organisation for Economic Co-operation and Development, as well as within the European Union to advance the shared US goal of a more open and market-led world economy and militarily in the context of the North Atlantic Treaty.

As the two nations were never at war or in serious conflict U.S. President Ronald Reagan referred to the alliance in 1982 as "the longest unbroken, peaceful relationship that we have had with any other nation." In 2011 U.S. President Barack Obama reaffirmed that "we have no stronger ally than the Netherlands". In 2018 U.S. President Donald Trump remarked that "the relationship with the Netherlands has never been better than it is now". The two countries have been allies in recent decades in military, anti-terrorism, anti-piracy and peacekeeping missions. They are also the third largest (from the Netherlands to the United States) and largest (from the United States to the Netherlands) direct foreign investors in each other's economies.

== History ==
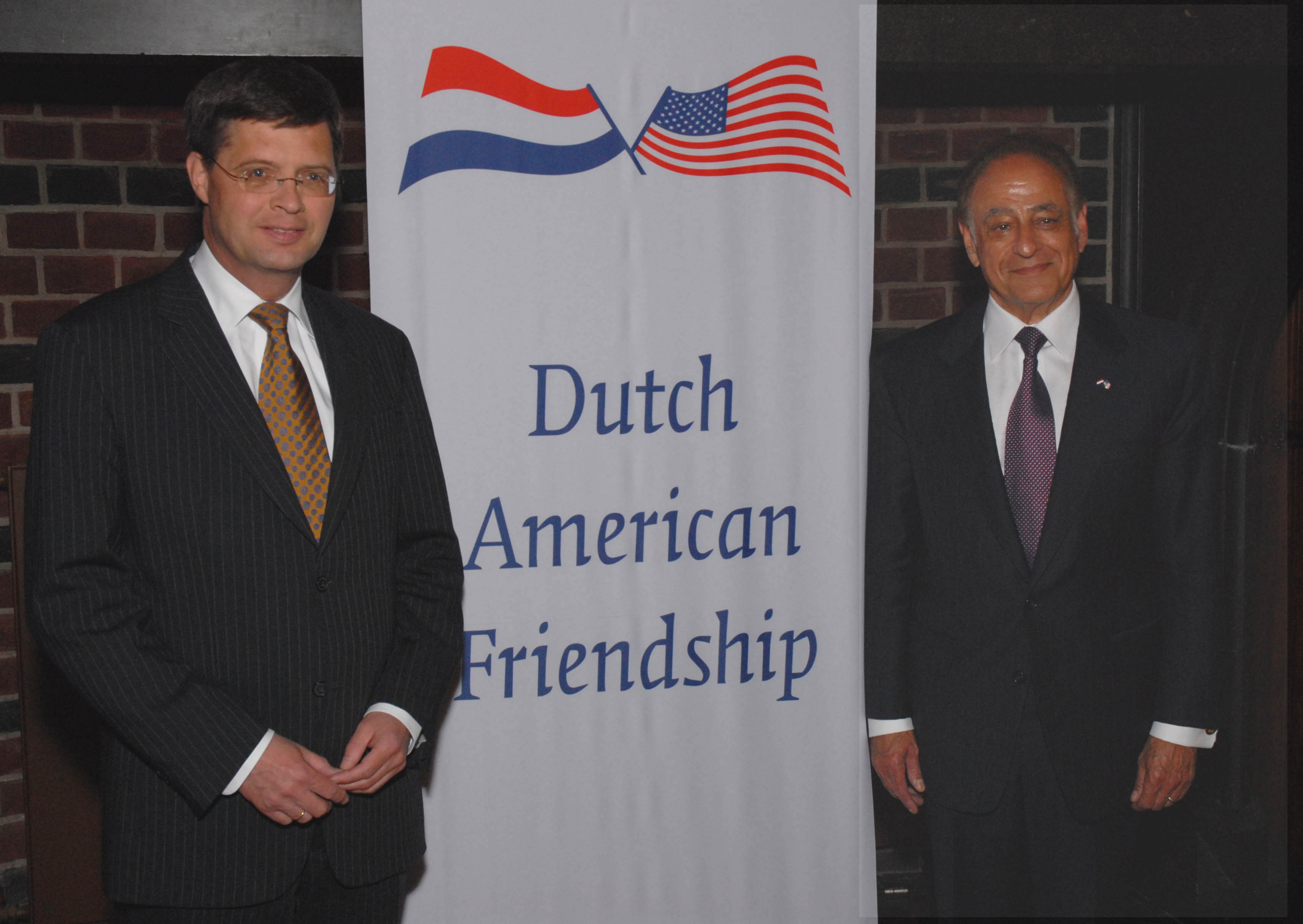
Dutch Prime Minister Jan Peter Balkenende and United States Ambassador Roland Arnall

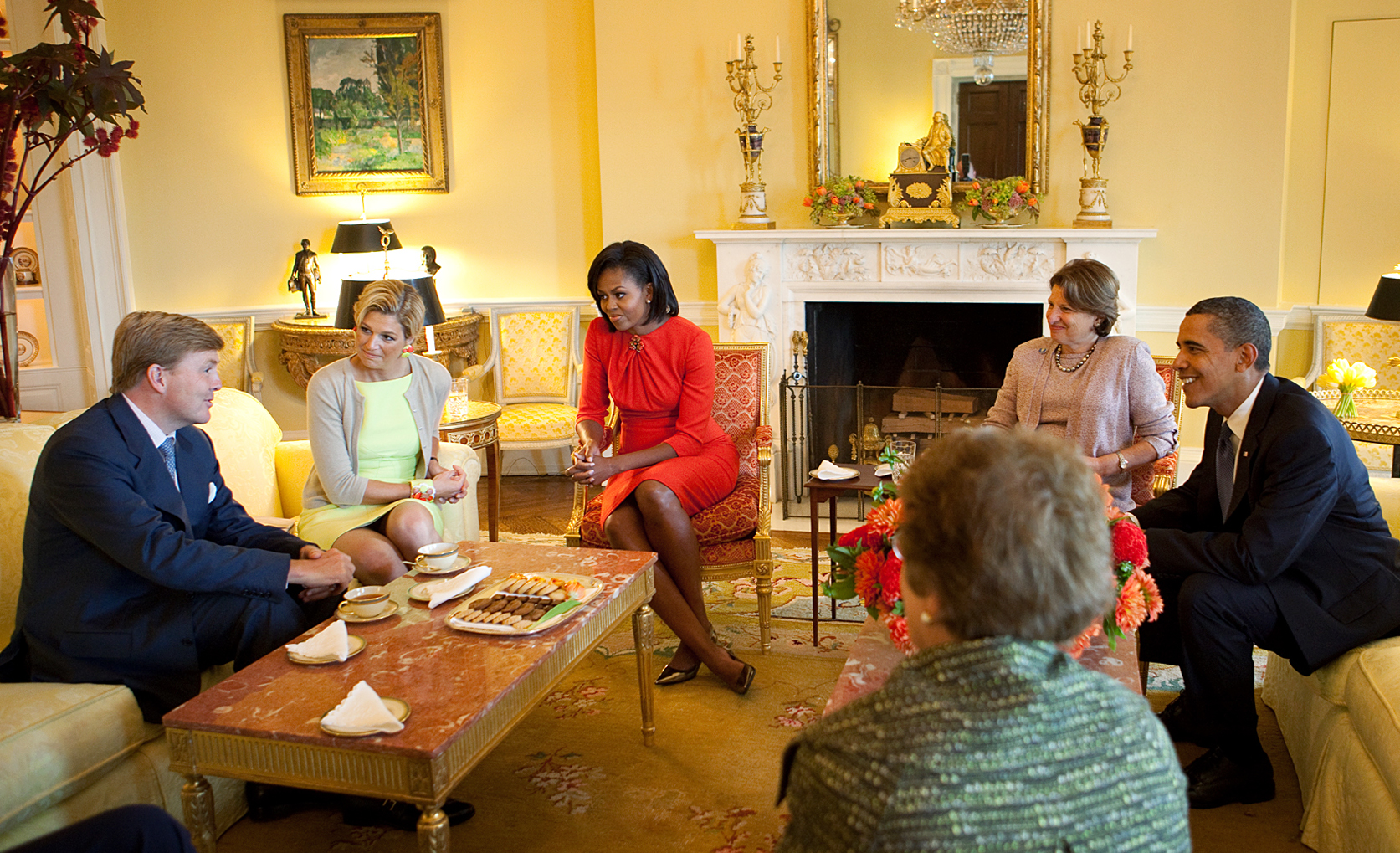
King Willem-Alexander, Queen Máxima, Michelle Obama, Barack Obama, and Fay Hartog-Levin (seen from behind) in the White House in 2009

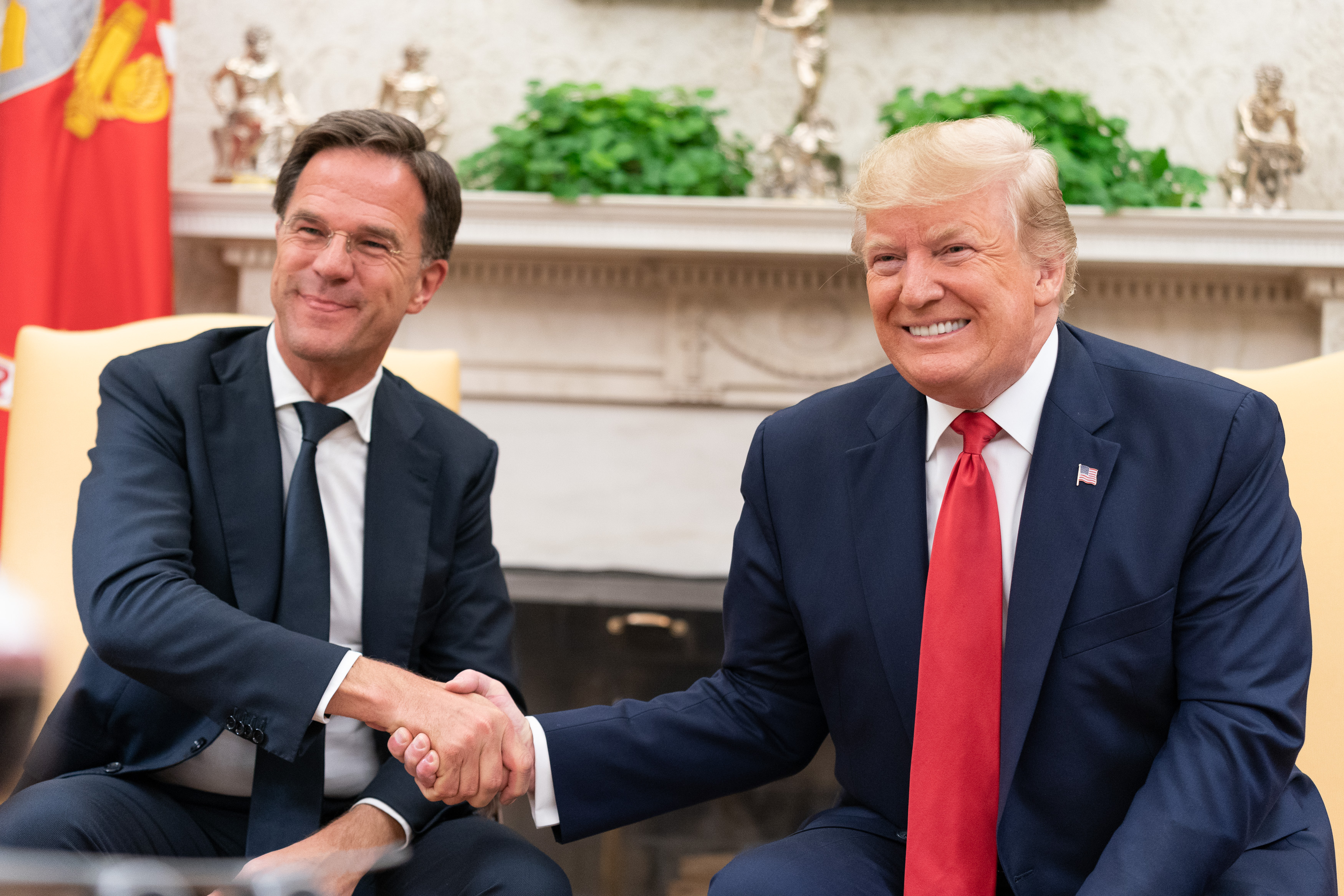
Dutch Prime Minister Mark Rutte with U.S. President Donald Trump in the Oval Office of the White House on 18 July 2019

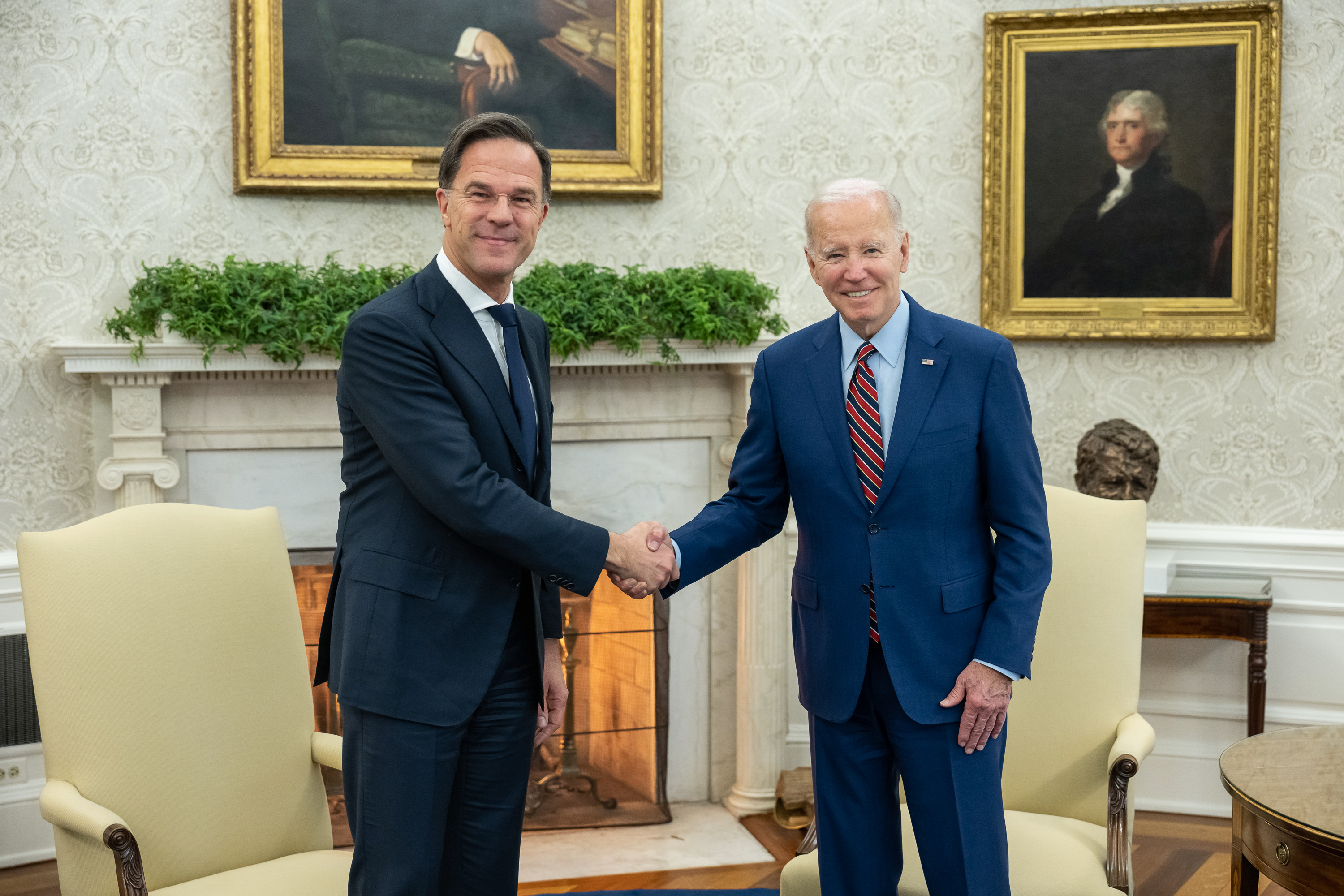
Dutch Prime Minister Mark Rutte with U.S. President Joe Biden in the Oval Office of the White House on 17 January 2023

The United States of America and the Kingdom of the Netherlands have been close allies since the United States became a sovereign nation with the treaty of Paris after the American Revolutionary War and have kept unbroken bilateral ties since.

=== 16th and 17th centuries ===
Starting in the late 16th century, the Dutch and other Europeans began to colonize the eastern coast of North America. The Dutch named their territory New Netherland, which became a colony of the Dutch Republic in 1624. The Dutch colonial settlement of New Amsterdam later became New York City. The present-day flag of New York City is based on the flag of Republic of the United Netherlands. Following the Act of Abjuration the newly independent Dutch Republic quickly rose to power as a major naval power during the Dutch Golden Age. Although primarily focused on the East, New Amsterdam and other Dutch colonies in the Americas quickly rose to significant importance for the Dutch West India Company. After the conclusion of the Second Anglo-Dutch War with the Treaty of Breda the Dutch Republic did not press its claim on New Netherland ending formal Dutch colonization of America.

=== 18th century ===
In the 18th century the Dutch republic supported the Thirteen Colonies during American Revolution from the outset as it was still embroiled in disputes with the British Empire over naval supremacy. Dutch merchants sold many goods to the American rebels, which helped the Thirteen Colonies gain independence from the British Empire. Nearly 4,000 tons of gunpowder was sent by the Dutch in the first half of 1775 alone, many more followed in the next years. The Dutch merchants also provided daily shipments of goods to the American Rebels. Gunpowder was not the only thing they supplied them with; the Dutch also supplied the American Rebels with weapons, including muskets and Dutch long-arms, and tulips. In 1780 John Adams was able to secure a $2 million loan from the Dutch Republic which was vital in funding the revolutionary war. Some historians even argue that without the Dutch helping the American rebels, the outcome of the American Revolutionary War might have been a British victory.

Though the action was disavowed by the government of the Netherlands, on November 16, 1776, the fort at St. Eustatius gave the first formal salute (firing its guns nine times) to a ship flying the American flag. After the pilgrims had lived and worked in Leiden, many founding fathers advocated for a diplomatic mission to the Netherlands. On April 19, 1782, John Adams was received by the States General in The Hague and recognized as Minister Plenipotentiary of the United States of America. By doing so, it became the second foreign country to recognize the United States (after France on February 6, 1778). The house that Adams purchased in The Hague became the first American embassy in the world. The Netherlands reciprocated in 1783 as Pieter Johan van Berckel was received as Minister Plenipotentiary in the United States.

Historically the support and friendship offered by the Dutch people to then ambassador John Adams in support of his petition to the States General to defeat the British Empire during the Revolutionary War is seen as the start of the unbroken alliance between the Netherlands and the United States.

=== 19th century ===
Dutch officers in Sumatra (then part of the Dutch East Indies) assisted the U.S. Navy during the First and Second Sumatran Expeditions in 1832 and 1838 respectively. Both operations were punitive expeditions, carried out against Chiefdom of Kuala Batee after the crews of U.S. merchant ships were massacred by the native Malays.

In 1861–63 the Lincoln administration looked abroad for places to relocate freed slaves who wanted to leave the United States. It opened U.S. negotiations with the Dutch government regarding African American migration and colonization of the Dutch colony of Suriname in South America. Nothing came of the idea, and after 1864 the idea was dropped.

U.S. and Dutch soldiers fought together during the Siege of the International Legations, part of the larger Boxer Rebellion in China.

=== 20th century ===
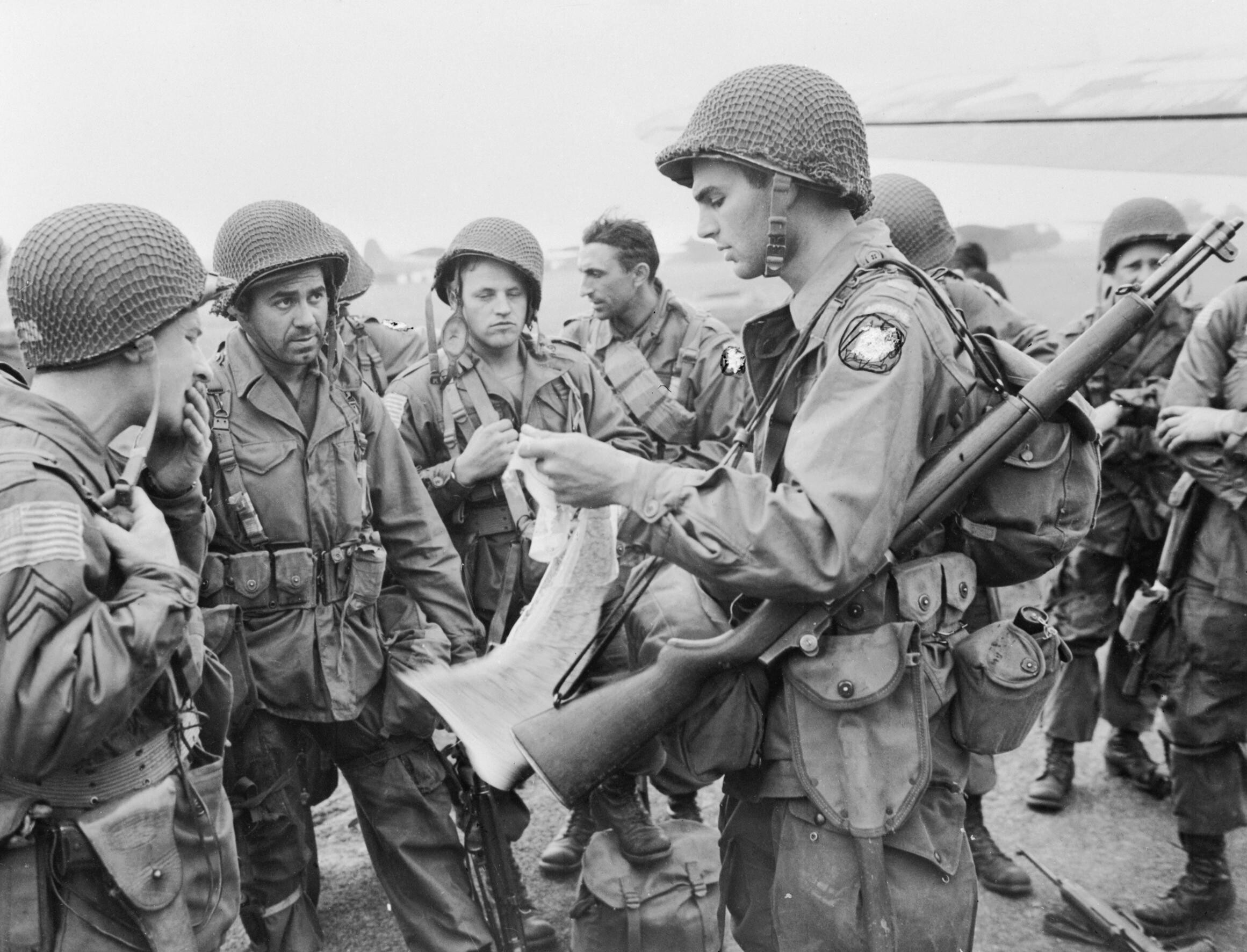
American paratroopers of the First Allied Airborne Army during Operation Market Garden, 17 September 1944

The Netherlands was steadfastly neutral in the late 19th and early 20th century trading with everyone but avoiding alliances. In foreign affairs it build up its overseas empire especially in the Dutch East Indies (now Indonesia). Neutrality did not stop the German invasion of the Netherlands in 1940. The Dutch government in exile remained allied to the United States and Dutch troops fought side by side with American troops in various theaters including the Pacific and Europe. The Dutch Resistance supplied intelligence and cooperated with the American effort to liberate Europe at the command of Queen Wilhelmina.

In peacetime following its liberation in 1945 by allied forces neutrality was no longer attractive for the Netherlands and they turned to the new hegemony of the United States as their principal security partner and in turn supported the United States goals in global political affairs. The Dutch tried for years to recover its valuable colony of Indonesia, but the United States was impressed with the anti-communist stance of the Indonesian Republic, and insisted that the Dutch leave. Resentfully, they did so, and refocused their attention on West European and trans-Atlantic relations. By the 1950s, according to Giles Scott-Smith the Americans considered the Dutch to be perfect allies in the Cold War:

The Dutch were politically close to the UK and were opposed to European affairs being dominated by either a renewed France or a resurgent Germany....the Dutch body politic, dominated as it was by the democratic socialists and Christian parties, was resoundingly anti-communist in outlook. The Netherlands was also positive towards a US-led free-trade regime, and during the Cold War was wholly committed to building a managed post-war economic and political order based around international organizations such as the International Monetary Fund (IMF), World Bank, and the Organisation for Economic Co-operation and Development (OECD).

In the post-war peace the U.S. was generous with Marshall Plan funds, designed to modernize Dutch technology and help it integrate into what became the European Union. The Netherlands political climate was dominated by a desire to never see war on the European continent again in the wake of World War 2 and Dutch foreign minister Dirk Uipko Stikker started advocating for a strong, militarily integrated trans-Atlantic alliance. Together with other Western Union members (Belgium, France, Luxembourg and the United Kingdom) and with the backing of the United States' secretary of state George C. Marshall they negotiated the Treaty of Brussels.

In recognition of the Dutch People's admiration and respect for the war hero Dwight D. Eisenhower, on his birthday October 14, 1947 at the Dutch embassy in Washington, D.C., ambassador Eelco van Kleffens presented the "legendary hero of World War II" with an ‘honorary sabre’. Weighing nearly five pounds, the gold-encrusted sabre was embedded with hundreds of gemstones and had been meticulously handcrafted by one of the most skillful goldsmiths in The Netherlands; Edelsmidse Brom Edelsmidse Brom in Utrecht.

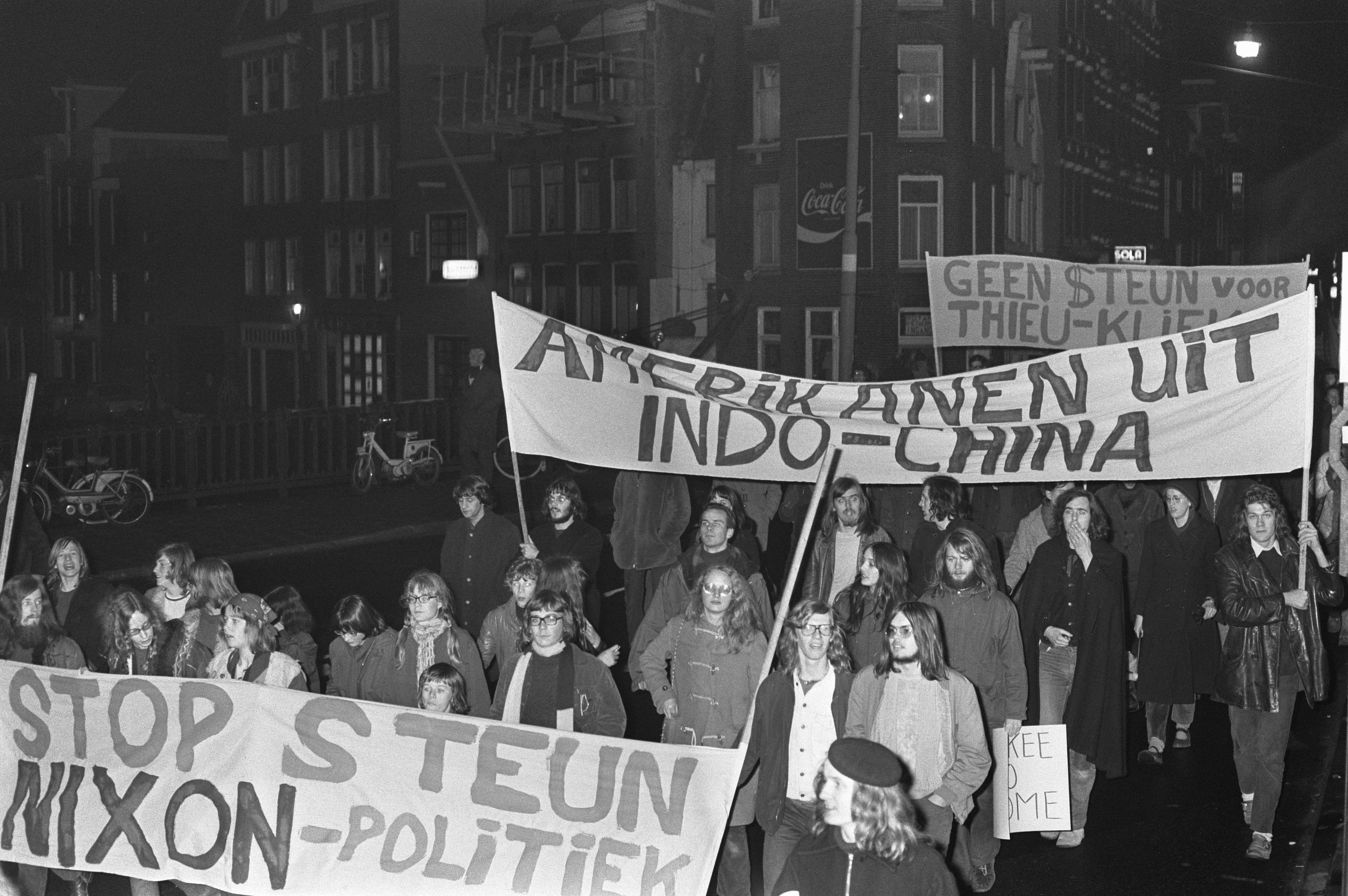
Demonstration in Amsterdam against the Vietnam War, 1972

With the Dutch American alliance for the first time taking on a decidedly military character, talks at the Pentagon in early 1948 laid the foundation for the North Atlantic Treaty. In recognition of his earlier work in establishing the Western Union, Dwight D Eisenhower advocated for Dirk Uipko Stikker to become its third secretary general.

Immediately following the tighter integration of military forces in the context of NATO, the United States became increasingly worried about the rise of communism in the second phase of the Cold War, culminating in the Korean War. With their newly established military cooperation, the Netherlands joined the United Nations Command. Despite strong anti-war sentiments in the Netherlands, the Netherlands Detachment United Nations (NDVN) was deployed to assist the United States military operation, with maritime efforts following shortly after.

As prosperity returned, Dutch tourists increasingly came to the United States. They had become fascinated by American movies, music, and television programs and took advantage of the sharp drop in transatlantic airfares in the 1960s. The tourists chose destinations based on their media exposure, so Hollywood and New York City were favored. Tourism thus reinforced the stereotypical images portrayed in the American media.

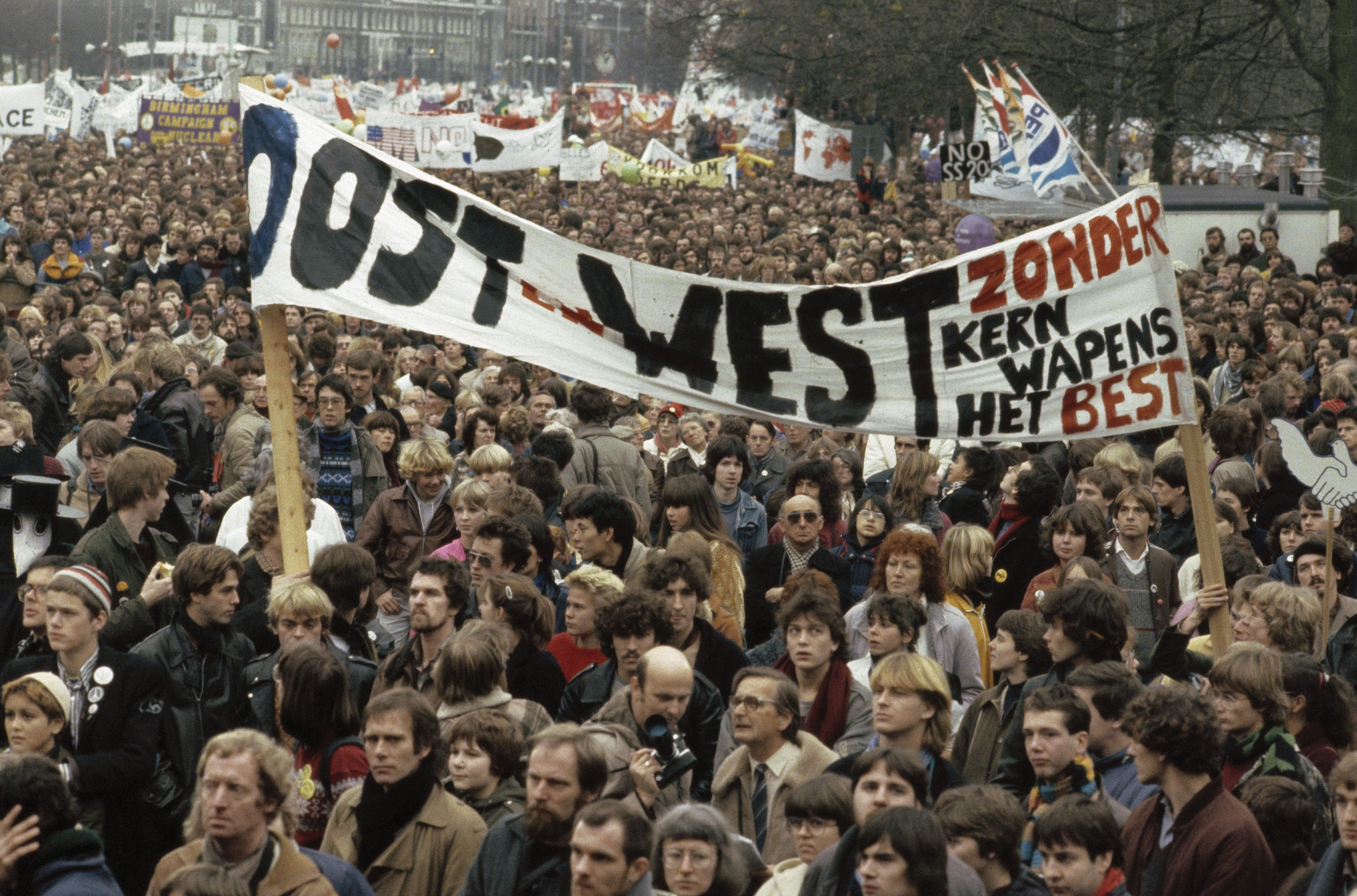
Protest in Amsterdam against the nuclear arms race between the U.S./NATO and the Soviet Union, 1981

Relations became tense in 1981 when United States President Ronald Reagan rejected détente and escalated the Cold War. Reagan deployed cruise missiles or INF (intermediate-range nuclear forces) weapons at Woensdrecht in the Netherlands to counter new Soviet missile deployments. A wave of protest resulted. In 1982 four Dutch journalists were killed by Washington-backed government forces in El Salvador. To calm the tensions, Washington sent a new ambassador, Paul Bremer. By 1985 he won Dutch approval for the INF deployment and the Dutch supported Reagan's dealings with Soviet President Mikhail Gorbachev.

In 1982 President Ronal Reagan marked April 19, 1982 as the first Dutch-American Friendship Day. It commemorates two centuries of unbroken diplomatic, economic, and peaceful Dutch-American relations.

In 1989 with tensions building in the lead up to the first Gulf War, the Netherlands joined the US led coalition against Iraq at the request of US secretary of state James Baker.

The Netherland and United States have been both held active roles in global peacekeeping efforts in the former Yugoslavia, Afghanistan, Lebanon and Sinai Peninsula.

== Modern relations ==
The countries were described by President George W. Bush as "brother nations", and by President Barack Obama as "one of our closest and some of our oldest and most precious allies". Obama has also said that, "Without the Netherlands there wouldn't be a United States of America".

The bilateral relations between the two nations are based on historical and cultural ties as well as a common dedication to individual freedom and human rights. The Netherlands shares with the United States a liberal economic outlook and is committed to free trade. The Netherlands is the third-largest direct foreign investor in the United States, and the Dutch-American trade and investment relationship is supporting close to 625,000 American jobs with Texas, California and Pennsylvania benefiting most from these economic ties. The United States is the third-largest direct foreign investor in the Netherlands.

The United States and the Netherlands often have similar positions on issues and work together both bilaterally and multilaterally in such institutions as the United Nations and NATO. The Dutch have worked with the United States at the World Trade Organization, in the Organisation for Economic Co-operation and Development, as well as within the European Union to advance the shared US goal of a more open and market-led world economy.

In 2001 the United States was attacked during the September 11 attacks and in response invoked article 5 of the North Atlantic Alliance for the first time since its inception. The royal armed forces of the Netherlands responded by mobilizing the 11th Airmobile Brigade and most of its active duty Air Force and started to actively patrol European air space with the halting of global commercial air travel to the United States with the activation of the SCATANA plan. The Dutch prime minister Wim Kok issued a statement vowing to bring to justice any and all perpetrators of the attack at any cost. Queen Beatrix conveyed her condolences per telegram to president Bush. With the subsequent United States invasion of Afghanistan the Netherlands were active participants in the International Security Assistance Force and Operation Enduring Freedom.

In 2005, George W. Bush traveled to several countries including the Netherlands to commemorate the 60th anniversary of World War 2 ending and commemorate Victory in Europe Day at the Netherlands American Cemetery and Memorial at Margraten near Maastricht. George W. Bush met with Jan Peter Balkenende during the visit to discuss trade and security matters. It is widely believed that Dutch Prime Minister asked for the end of using the Netherlands as a hub in the CIA's extraordinary renditions.

In 2016, the Netherlands joined the U.S.-led coalition against ISIL in Iraq and Syria. During the first presidency of Donald Trump the American troops stationed in the Netherlands increased by a few.

In August 2023, as part of the agreement the United States approved delivery of advanced F-16 fighter jets from the Netherlands to Ukraine. In 2024, the Netherlands and the United States entered into security agreements with Ukraine in response to the Russian invasion of Ukraine as part of a larger NATO initiative to support Ukraine with ammunition and weapons systems. The appointment of Mark Rutte as Secretary General of NATO was favored by the United States president Joe Biden.

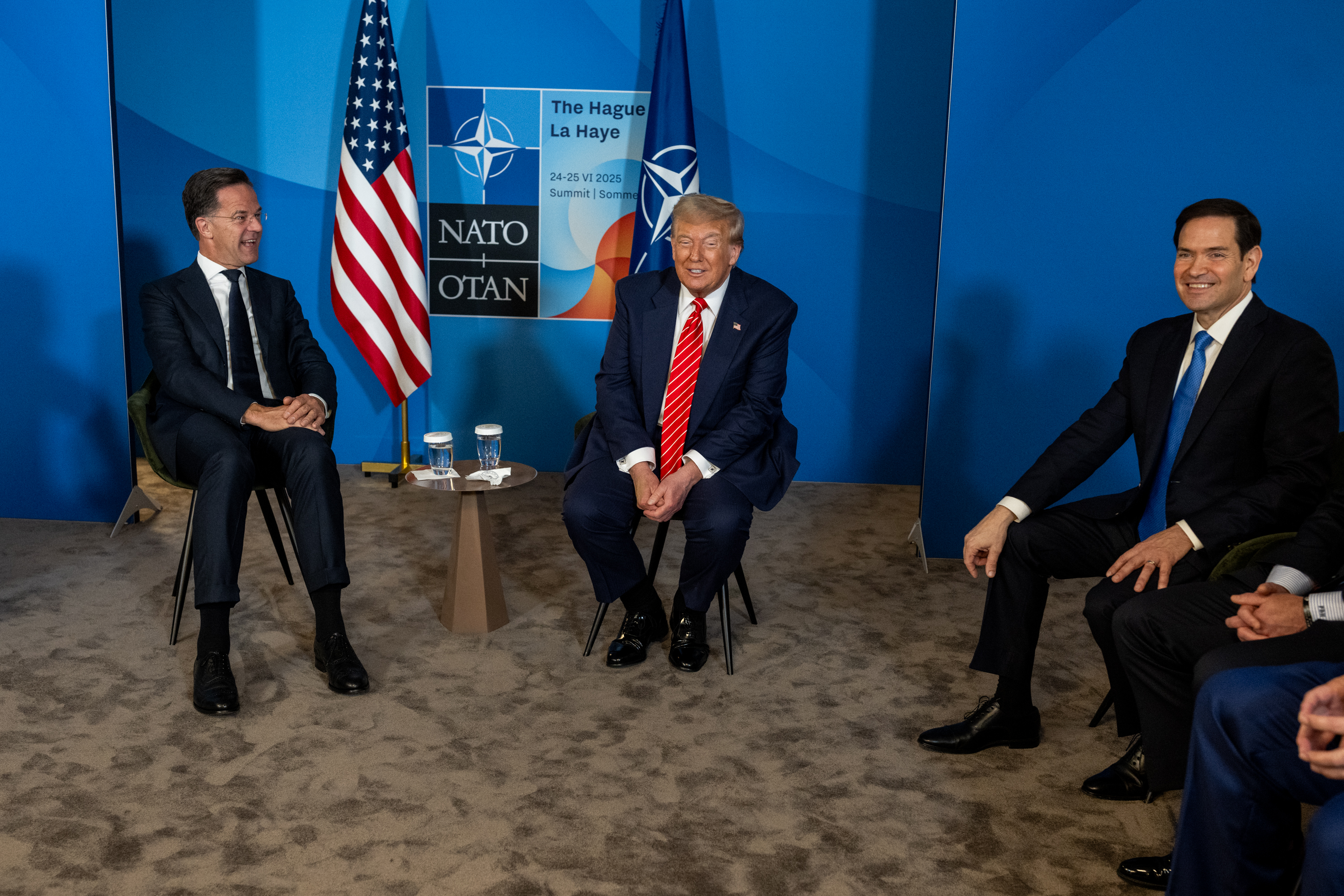
U.S. President Donald Trump with NATO General Secretary Mark Rutte at the NATO Summit in The Hague, Netherlands, 25 June 2025

In 2025, the Netherlands hosted the 2025 The Hague NATO summit and invited president Donald Trump to stay at Huis ten Bosch on June 24 after the traditional pre-summit dinner. The summit was a crucial diplomatic event for Dutch diplomats, captured as "Hosting the NATO Summit was a unique opportunity to show how the Netherlands contributes to international peace and security." The pre-summit dinner was opened with a speech from his royal highness Willem-Alexander who personally invited Trump to spend the night at the palace as his personal guest, the first time ever such an invitation was issued to a non-royal foreign dignitary. After a warm welcome where Trump met Catharina-Amalia, Princess of Orange for the first time, the king especially asked for attention to Article 3 of the NATO charter in his speech citing an increasing threat from Russia, further highlighting the joint approach between the United States and the Netherlands in their bid to influence all NATO countries to increase their spending to 5%. In the approach to the summit Donald Trump shared an unprecedented intimate look into the personal communications between himself and former prime-minister and the Dutch's foremost diplomat NATO Secretary Mark Rutte by sharing private messages on his Truth Social account, highlighting the close and familiar tone between the Dutch and American diplomats at the highest level. During the summit Dutch and American diplomats worked together to ensure new agreement on the 5% of GDP spending goal was adopted without issue despite early pushback from Spain. In remarks to the media president Trump referenced the close relation with Mark Rutte saying "I came here because it was something I'm supposed to be doing, but I left here a little bit differently. [..] I watched the heads of these countries get up and the love and the passion that they showed for their country was unbelievable. I've never seen quite anything like it. They they want to protect their country and they need the United States and without the United States, it's not going to be the same. And you can ask Mark or you can ask any of the people that were there. It was really moving to see it. They love their country. They were so respectful of me because I'm the head of the United States [..] Without the United States, we couldn't they couldn't really have NATO. It wouldn't work. It couldn't work. [..] And I left here differently. I I left here saying that these people really love their countries. It's not a ripoff and we're here to help them protect their country. [..] It was wonderful". Media sources have referred to the Dutch strategy as 'flattery' and some have suggested the Dutch approach changed president Trump's mind on NATO.

On April 8, 2026, NATO Secretary General Mark Rutte held a "very frank" meeting with President Trump at the White House to discuss the ongoing conflict in Iran and the blockade of the Strait of Hormuz. Following the talks, Trump publicly criticized NATO on Truth Social, accusing the alliance of failing to support U.S. military efforts and questioning its future reliability. These escalating geopolitical tensions, combined with domestic scrutiny of Prime Minister Rob Jetten’s participation due to his past criticisms of the U.S. President, have heightened the diplomatic sensitivity surrounding the subsequent impending royal tour.

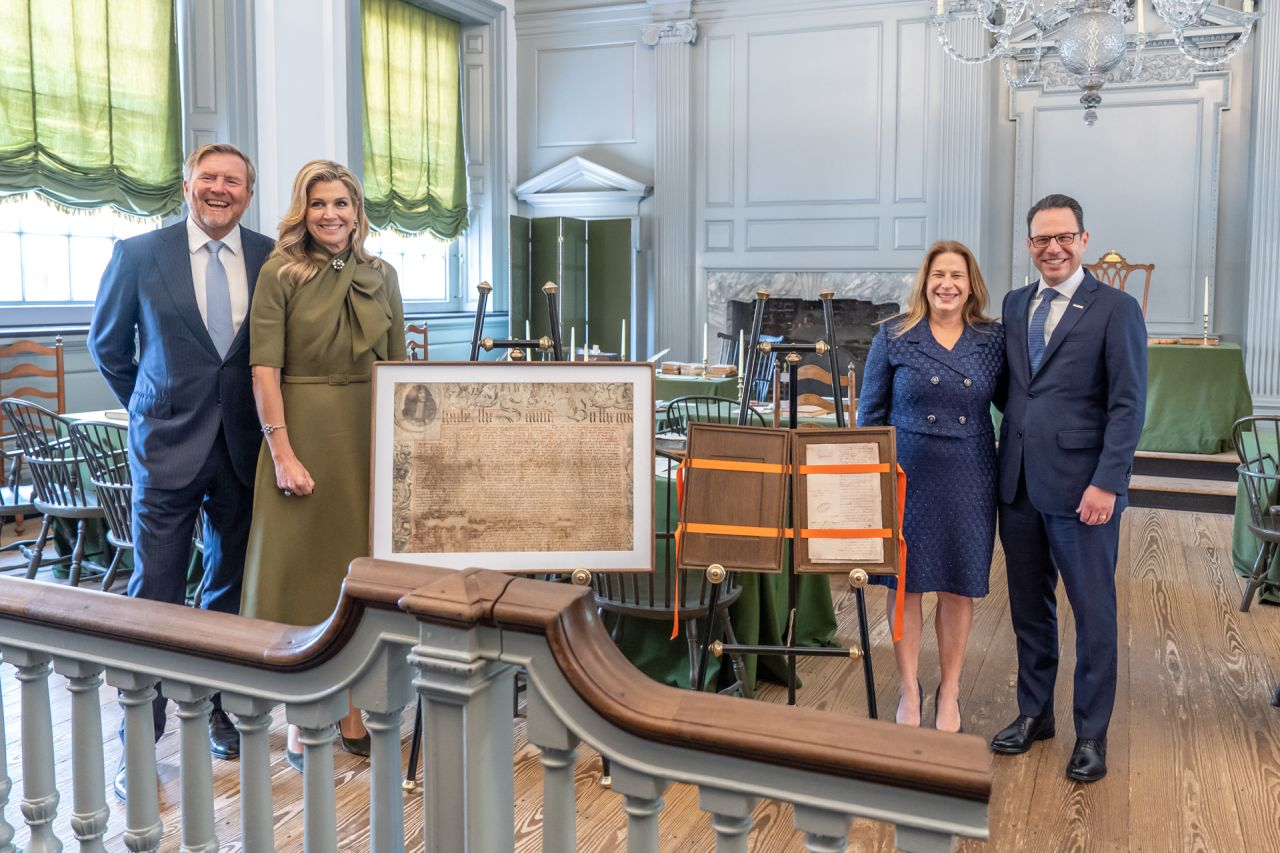
Dutch King and Queen present Pennsylvania's Governor with copy of Act of Abjuration, Independence Hall, April 2026

In 2026 King Willem-Alexander and Queen Máxima of the Netherlands conducted a working visit to the United States from April 13 to 15, 2026, traveling to Philadelphia, Washington D.C., and Miami. The visit focuses on reinforcing economic cooperation and celebrating the 250th anniversary of American independence, highlighting the historical and bilateral relationship between the Kingdom of the Netherlands and the United States. Throughout the tour, the royal couple are joined by high-level officials, including Prime Minister Rob Jetten and ministers Tom Berendsen and Sjoerd Sjoerdsma, and business leaders. The itinerary featured a rare invitation for the royal couple to stay overnight at the White House, a gesture following President Trump’s previous visit to the Netherlands for the 2025 NATO summit. Although the Dutch cabinet acknowledged the "awkward" geopolitical timing ahead of the visit, officials emphasized the visit's strategic importance for maintaining diplomatic access and strengthening the NATO alliance. While supported by a majority of Dutch political parties, the trip faced criticism from certain opposition groups who cited President Trump's controversial foreign policy rhetoric as a reason for cancellation.

On April 13, the visit commenced in Philadelphia, where Governor Josh Shapiro hosted the royal couple at Independence Hall and the Liberty Bell. The itinerary emphasized the $3.7 billion bilateral trade relationship between the Netherlands and Pennsylvania, specifically within the life sciences and agricultural sectors. During the visit, Minister Sjoerd Sjoerdsma signed a letter of understanding to facilitate collaboration in advanced manufacturing, robotics, and biotechnology. The leaders also noted upcoming 2026 events in the city, including a FIFA World Cup fixture featuring Curaçao. The king presented the city of Pennsylvania with an original copy of the Act of Abjuration, directly linking it to the declaration of independence. It will go on display at the Museum of the American Revolution. The king referenced the shared democratic values of both nations, quoting Benjamin Franklin: "In free governments the rulers are the servants, and the people their superiors and sovereigns." On the evening of April 13, the royal couple traveled to Washington D.C. for an official reception and dinner, where they were joined by Prime Minister Rob Jetten. A focal point of the visit is the couple's overnight stay at the White House, a rare diplomatic gesture following President Trump's 2025 stay at Paleis Huis ten Bosch during the NATO summit in the Netherlands. The dinner was in the 'Red Room', presumably because of its size and style and because it prominently features a bust of Martin Van Buren – the only Dutch speaking president of the US. The dinner featured a Dutch-American theme; spinach soup served with scallops, followed by the main course: a fillet of sole with pommes pavé, also known as "thousand-layer potatoes" finished with an American classic dessert: Neapolitan Baked Alaska.

After the dinner Prime Minister Rob Jetten remarked that "after 250 years of friendship between the US and the Netherlands it offers you the opportunity [...] to be in an open conversation, where you can disagree respectfully. Everything can be discussed, even the policies on which you disagree with the mutual understanding that at the end of the talks we are stronger together on security and economic matters." Dutch media has widely interpreted this as a disagreement over the conflict in Iran, but which items were disagreed upon was not made explicit. Because Zr.Ms. De Ruyte has been deployed to region it does appear that the Dutch are cooperating with the United States navy in the conflict. Overall state media NOS concluded it was a major public win for Willem Alexander as he was able to maneuver Jetten into the white house for rare one on one time with Trump.

On April 27 the Secretary of State, Marco Rubio, congratulated people of the Kingdom of the Netherlands – and notably the king personally – and remarked ".. as close Allies, the United States and the Netherlands stand shoulder to shoulder in advancing security and addressing global challenges." and wished them joyful celebrations for koningsdag.

In September 2026, it was reported that the Netherland transported 86 tonnes of gold from the US and Canada to Zeist, at the same time an equivalent amount was shipped to the Bank of England, explained by Dutch Bank president Olaf Sleijpen as "necessary to strengthen our resilience and preparedness".

== Diplomatic missions ==
=== Dutch missions ===
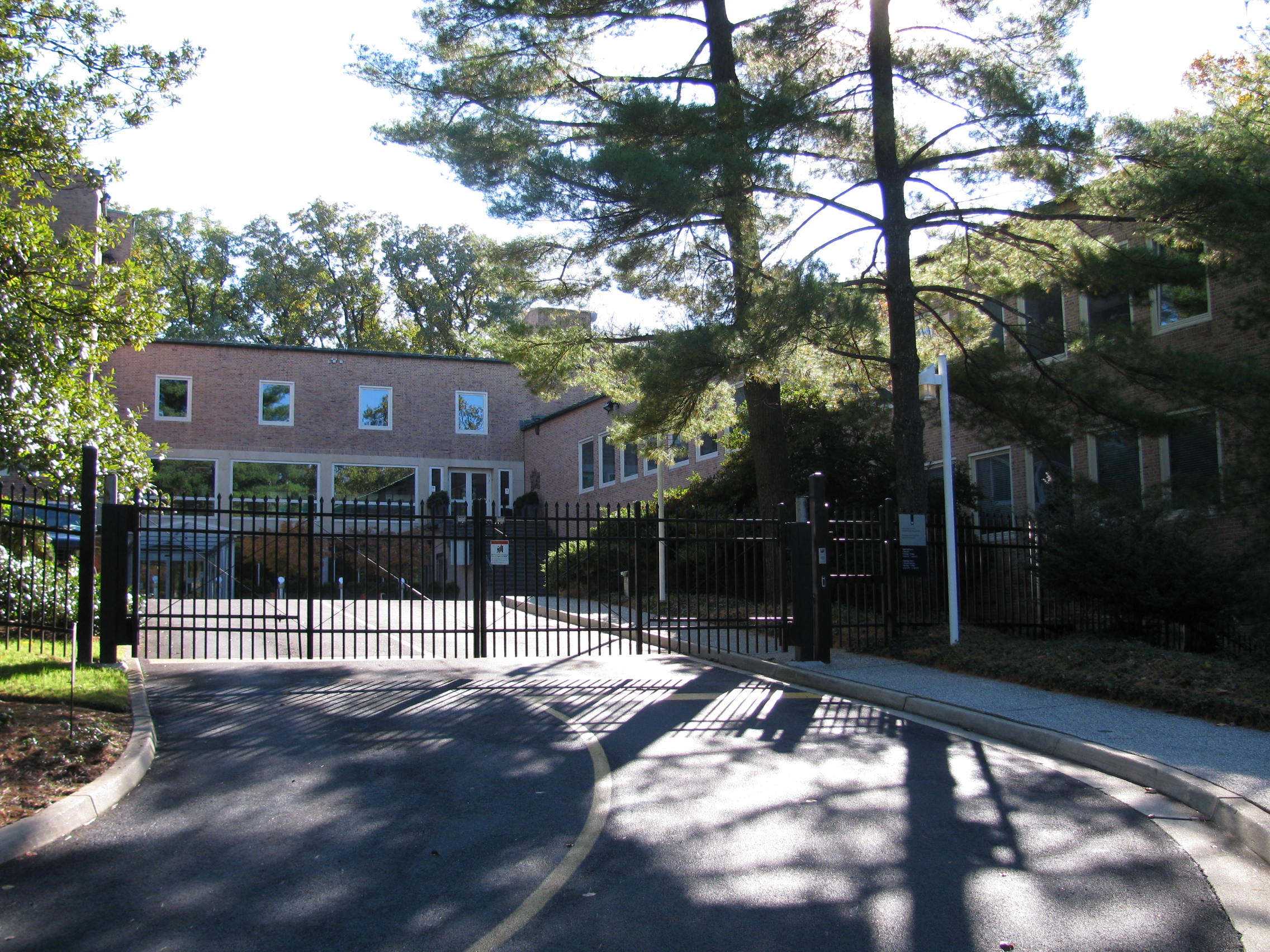
Embassy of the Netherlands, Washington, D.C.

- Washington, D.C. (Embassy)
- Atlanta (Consulate-General)
- Chicago (Consulate-General)
- Miami (Consulate-General)
- New York City (Consulate-General)
- San Francisco (Consulate-General)

=== U.S. missions ===
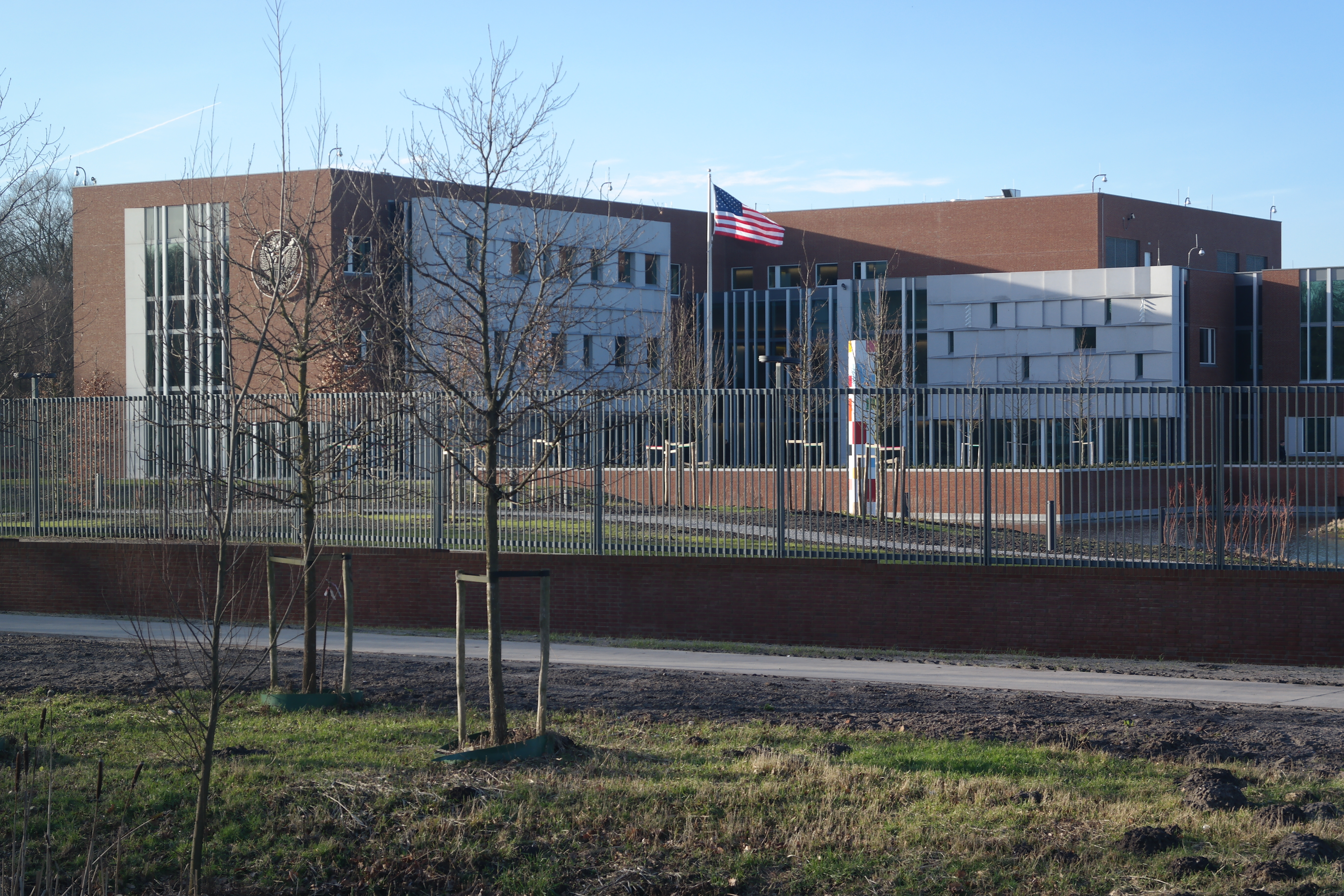
Embassy of the United States, The Hague

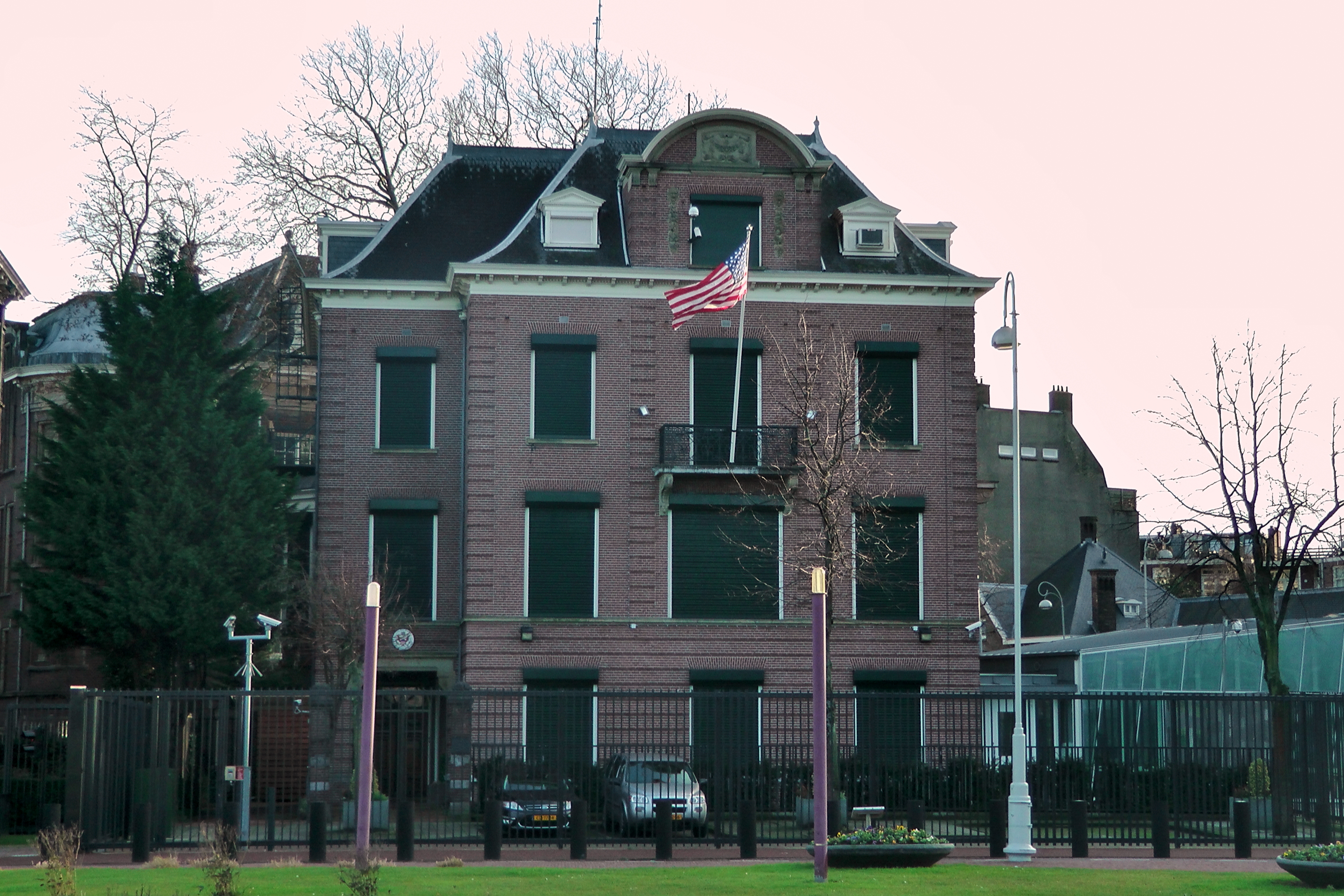
U.S. Consulate General in Amsterdam

- The Hague (Embassy)
- Amsterdam (Consulate-General)

In the Caribbean part of the Kingdom, the U.S. has a consulate-general

- Willemstad (Consulate General of the United States, Curaçao)

The U.S. Consulate General in Willemstad operates as its own mission, with the Consul General as the "Chief of Mission". As such, the Consul General is not under the jurisdiction of the Ambassador to the Netherlands, and reports directly to the U.S. Department of State as do other chiefs of mission, who are ambassadors in charge of embassies.

==== Ambassadors ====
- Pete Hoekstra 2018–2021
- Marja Verloop 2021–2022
- Shefali Razdan Duggal 2022–2025
- Joseph Popolo Jr. 2025–present

== Public opinion ==
According to a 2026 Pew Research Center survey, 25% of Dutch people had a favorable view of the United States, while 71% had a negative view.

== Incidents ==
- The American Service-Members' Protection Act, passed in 2002 under President George W. Bush, grants the US president authorization to use "all means necessary and appropriate to bring about the release of any U.S. or allied personnel being detained or imprisoned by, on behalf of, or at the request of the International Criminal Court." It has been derisively nicknamed "The Hague Invasion Act", as it would in theory authorize the president of the United States to invade The Hague, which is the seat of the Dutch government and the seat of several international criminal courts, should they prosecute an American citizen or ally. The act is widely considered to be symbolic, and that the threat of invasion by the U.S. is unrealistic.
- US ambassador Pete Hoekstra had stated previously erroneously in the US in 2015 that

The Islamic movement has now gotten to a point where they have put Europe into chaos. Chaos in the Netherlands, there are cars being burnt, there are politicians that are being burnt ... and yes, there are no-go zones in the Netherlands.
In an interview on Dutch television on 22 December 2017, Hoekstra first denied having said this, later calling this fake news, then denying that he had called it fake news, before finally offering his apologies the day after.

== See also ==
- Foreign relations of the Netherlands
- Foreign relations of the United States
- Dutch Americans
