= List of ambassadors of the Netherlands to the United States =

Ambassador of the Netherlands to the United States of America
- Coat of arms of the Netherlands
- Incumbent; Birgitta Tazelaar since 16 September 2023
- Type: Diplomatic representative
- Reports to: Ministry of Foreign Affairs
- Formation: 4 March 1783 (243 years ago)
- First holder: Pieter J. van Berckel

The ambassador of the Netherlands to the United States is the official representative of the government of the Netherlands to the government of the United States.

== List of representatives ==
| Representative | Agrément | Credence | Head of state | Term end |
|---|---|---|---|---|
| Pieter Johan van Berckel | 4 March 1783 | 31 October 1783 | Elias Boudinot (Confederation Congress) | 25 August 1788 |
| Franco Petrus van Berckel | 15 May 1789 | | Cyrus Griffin (Confederation Congress) | 5 September 1795 |
| Rogier Gerard van Polanen | 30 August 1796 | | George Washington | 18 October 1802 |
| François Daniel Changuion | October 1814 | | James Madison | July 1818 |
| Christiaan Bangeman Huygens | 1825 | | James Monroe | 1832 |
| Frans Mattheus Wenceslas baron Testa | 1845 | | James K. Polk | 1852 |
| Wilhelm Ferdinand Heinrich von Weckherlin | 1882 | | James A. Garfield | 1899 |
| Willem Alexander Frederik Gevers | 12 March 1900 | | William McKinley | |
| Herman van Roijen | 1 March 1904 | | Theodore Roosevelt | |
| René de Marees van Swinderen | 23 April 1904 | | Theodore Roosevelt | |
| John Loudon | 19 October 1908 | | Theodore Roosevelt | |
| Willem Louis Frederik Christiaan van Rappard | 24 November 1913 | | Woodrow Wilson | |
| August Philips | 19 February 1918 | | Woodrow Wilson | |
| Willem Hendrik de Beaufort | 9 April 1918 | | Woodrow Wilson | |
| Jacob Theodoor Cremer | 29 November 1918 | | Woodrow Wilson | |
| Jan Charles August Everwijn | 19 September 1921 | | Warren G. Harding | |
| Jan Bastiaan Hubrecht | 3 June 1922 | | Warren G. Harding | |
| Andries Cornelis Dirk de Graeff | 10 January 1923 | | Calvin Coolidge | |
| Hubert van Asch van Wijck | 15 May 1926 | | Calvin Coolidge | |
| Herman van Roijen | 15 March 1927 | | Calvin Coolidge | |
| Caspar van Breugel Douglas | 12 July 1933 | | Franklin D. Roosevelt | |
| Hendrik Maurits van Haersma de With | 22 January 1934 | | Franklin D. Roosevelt | |
| Count W. van Rechteren Limpurg | 1 November 1938 | | Franklin D. Roosevelt | |
| Alexander Loudon | 19 December 1938 | 22 December 1938 | Franklin D. Roosevelt | |
| Pim van Boetzelaer van Oosterhout | May 1940 | August 1940 | Franklin D. Roosevelt | |
| Alexander Loudon | 7 May 1942 | | Franklin D. Roosevelt | |
| Eelco van Kleffens | 24 July 1947 | 31 July 1947 | Harry S. Truman | |
| Herman van Roijen | 9 September 1950 | 19 September 1950 | Harry S. Truman | |
| Carl Willem Alwin Schurmann | 26 May 1964 | 7 July 1964 | Lyndon B. Johnson | |
| Baron Rijnhard Bernhard Van Lynden | 16 September 1969 | 16 October 1969 | Richard Nixon | |
| Baron Albrecht N. Van Aerssen Beijeren | 15 August 1974 | | Gerald Ford | |
| FC. Baron van Aerssen Beijeren van Voshol | 15 August 1974 | | Gerald Ford | |
| Age Robert Tammenoms Bakker | 23 September 1974 | 4 October 1974 | Gerald Ford | |
| Jan Hendrik Lubbers | 25 August 1980 | 29 August 1980 | Jimmy Carter | |
| Richard Hendrik Fein | 19 April 1984 | 18 June 1984 | Ronald Reagan | |
| Johan Hendrik Meesman | 26 January 1990 | 5 February 1990 | George H. W. Bush | |
| Adriaan Jacobovitz de Szeged | 28 April 1993 | 23 June 1993 | Bill Clinton | |
| Joris Michael Vos | 9 October 1997 | 12 November 1997 | Bill Clinton | |
| Boudewijn van Eenennaam | 11 March 2002 | 19 June 2002 | George W. Bush | |
| Christiaan Mark Johan Kroner | 15 August 2006 | 12 September 2006 | George W. Bush | |
| Renée Jones-Bos | 21 August 2008 | 17 September 2008 | George W. Bush | |
| Rudolf Bekink | 20 July 2012 | 30 July 2012 | Barack Obama | |
| Hendrik Jan Jurriaan Schuwer | 2 September 2015 | | Barack Obama | 2019 |
| André Haspels | | 16 August 2019 | Donald Trump | 2023 |
| Birgitta Tazelaar | | 23 August 2023 | Joe Biden | |
