= Herman van Roijen (born 1871) =

J. Herman van Roijen
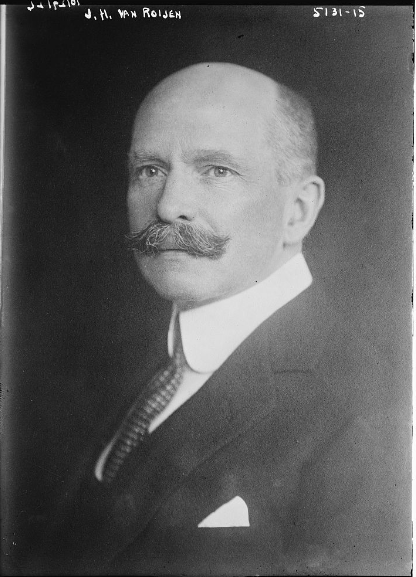

Dutch Ambassador to the United States
- In office 1927–1933
- Monarch: Wilhelmina
- President: Calvin Coolidge
- Prime Minister: Dirk Jan de Geer
- Preceded by: Hubert van Asch van Wijck
- Succeeded by: Caspar van Breugel Douglas

Dutch Ambassador to Spain
- In office 1919–1927
- Monarch: Wilhelmina
- Prime Minister: Pieter Cort van der Linden; Charles Ruijs de Beerenbrouck

Dutch Ambassador to Italy
- In office 1913–1919
- Monarch: Wilhelmina
- Prime Minister: Charles Ruijs de Beerenbrouck

Personal details
- Born: 28 March 1871 Zwolle, Overijssel, The Netherlands
- Died: 31 August 1933 (aged 62) The Hague, South Holland, The Netherlands
- Spouse: Albertina Taylor Winthrop (m. 1904)
- Children: Jan Herman van Roijen Jr. Robert Dudlen van Roijen
- Parent(s): Jan Hermannus van Roijen; Anna Aleida van Engelen

Jan Herman van Roijen (28 March 1871 – 31 August 1933) was a Dutch diplomat.

== Early life ==
Jan Herman was born on 28 March 1871, in Zwolle, Overijssel. He was a son of Jan Hermannus van Roijen (1827–1883) and the former Anna Aleida van Engelen (1831–1911). His father served as an Alderman of Zwolle.

A member of the politically prominent Van Roijen family, his paternal grandparents were Senator Isaäc Antoni van Roijen and Anna Gesina van Engelen and his maternal grandparents were Nicolaas van Engelen and Margaretha Machteld Francina Badings. Among his uncles were Hendricus Nicolaus van Roijen, Berend van Roijen (father of Isaac Antoni van Roijen, mayor of Hoogezand), and Stephanus Jacobus van Roijen (father of Isaac Antoni van Roijen, the mayor of Zwolle).

== Career ==
From 1905 to 1908, during the administration of Prime Minister Theo de Meester, he served as the Dutch chargé d'affaires to the United Kingdom in London. During Theo Heemskerk's tenure as prime minister from 1908 to 1913, Van Roijen was the Dutch Minister to the United States.

From 1913 to 1919, he served as the Dutch Minister to Madrid under Prime Minister Pieter Cort van der Linden and Charles Ruijs de Beerenbrouck, followed by Dutch Minister to Italy Rome from 1919 to 1927. He again served as the Dutch Minister to the United States from 1927 to 1933.

Upon his return to New York, he was honored by several Netherland Societies, including the Netherland-America Foundation. In 1931, he brought Queen Wilhelmina's greetings to the 41st annual dinner of the Holland Society of New York.

== Personal life ==
On 17 May 1904, Van Roijen was married to Albertina Taylor Winthrop (1871–1934) at the residence of the bride's mother, 38 East 37th Street overlooking Park Avenue in New York City, by the Reverend William Reed Huntington, rector of Grace Church. She was the daughter of banker Robert Winthrop and the former Kate Wilson Taylor (a daughter of Moses Taylor, a prominent railroad financier who served as president of National City Bank). Her brother, Beekman Winthrop, was the Assistant Secretary of the Navy in the Taft Administration, and her sister Katharine Taylor Winthrop, was the wife of U.S. Senator Hamilton Fish Kean. Together, they were the parents of two sons:

- Herman van Roijen (1905–1991), who also served as Dutch Ambassador to the United States. He married Anne Snouck Hurgronje.
- Robert Dudley van Roijen (1907–1981), a cattle farmer, Central Intelligence Agency official, and owner of Robert B. Luce Inc., a Washington publishing firm. He married Hildegarde Portner Graham, half-sister of U.S. Ambassador to Austria John P. Humes, in 1938.

While on his annual vacation back in Holland, Van Roijen died at his villa in The Hague on 31 August 1933.

=== Descendants ===
Through his eldest son Jan Herman, he was a grandfather of four. Through his son Robert, he was a grandfather of Peter Portner van Roijen, who was married to Beatrice Sterling Frelinghuysen (a daughter of U.S. Representative Peter Frelinghuysen Jr.), by the Right Reverend Anson Phelps Stokes, in 1970, and Robert Dudley van Roijen Jr., who married Susan Emily Frelinghuysen (a daughter of author Joseph S. Frelinghuysen Jr.) in 1981.
