= Joke Brandt =

Dutch diplomat and administrator (b. 1958)

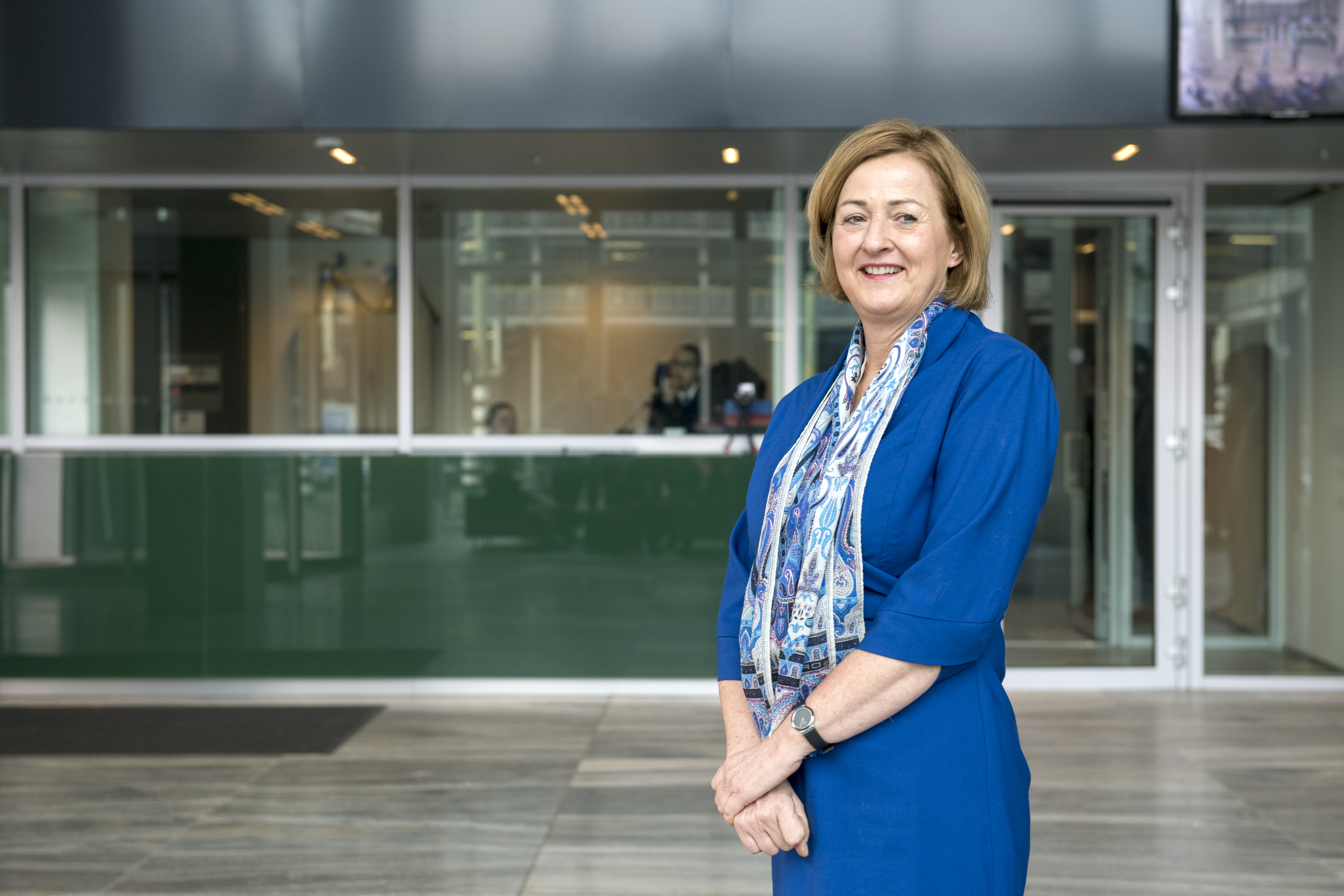

Permanent Representative of the Netherlands to the United Nations
- In office 2020–2024

Secretary General of the Ministry of Foreign Affairs
- In office 2016–2020

Deputy Executive Director of UNICEF
- In office 2012–2016

Director General for International Cooperation, Ministry of Foreign Affairs
- In office 2008–2012

Ambassador of the Netherlands to Uganda
- In office 2004–2007

Ambassador of the Netherlands to Eritrea
- In office 2000–2004

Personal details
- Born: 1958 (age 67–68)
- Education: Utrecht University

Johanna M. G. (Joke) Brandt, also known internationally as Yoka Brandt (born 1958), is a Dutch diplomat, administrator and civil servant who served as her country's Permanent Representative to the United Nations in New York from 2020 to 2024. She was previously Deputy Executive Director of UNICEF (2012−2016) and the Dutch ambassador to Uganda (2004-2007) and Eritrea (2000−2004).

== Career ==
Brandt studied geography and development at Utrecht University and worked as a civil servant at the Ministry of Foreign Affairs, spending some time at the embassy in South Africa, before serving as ambassador to Eritrea (2000−2004) and Uganda (2004−2007).

In 2007, having returned to The Hague, she became Deputy Director General for International Cooperation at the Ministry of Foreign Affairs before assuming the role of Director General the following year. After a four-year spell as Deputy Executive Director of UNICEF in New York, she was selected to succeed Renée Jones-Bos as Secretary General of the Ministry.

In 2020 she was appointed Permanent Representative of the Netherlands to the United Nations in New York, the first woman to hold that office. She was succeeded in 2024 by Lise Gregoire-van Haaren.
