= Hendrik Jan Jurriaan Schuwer =

Dutch career diplomat

Henne Schuwer
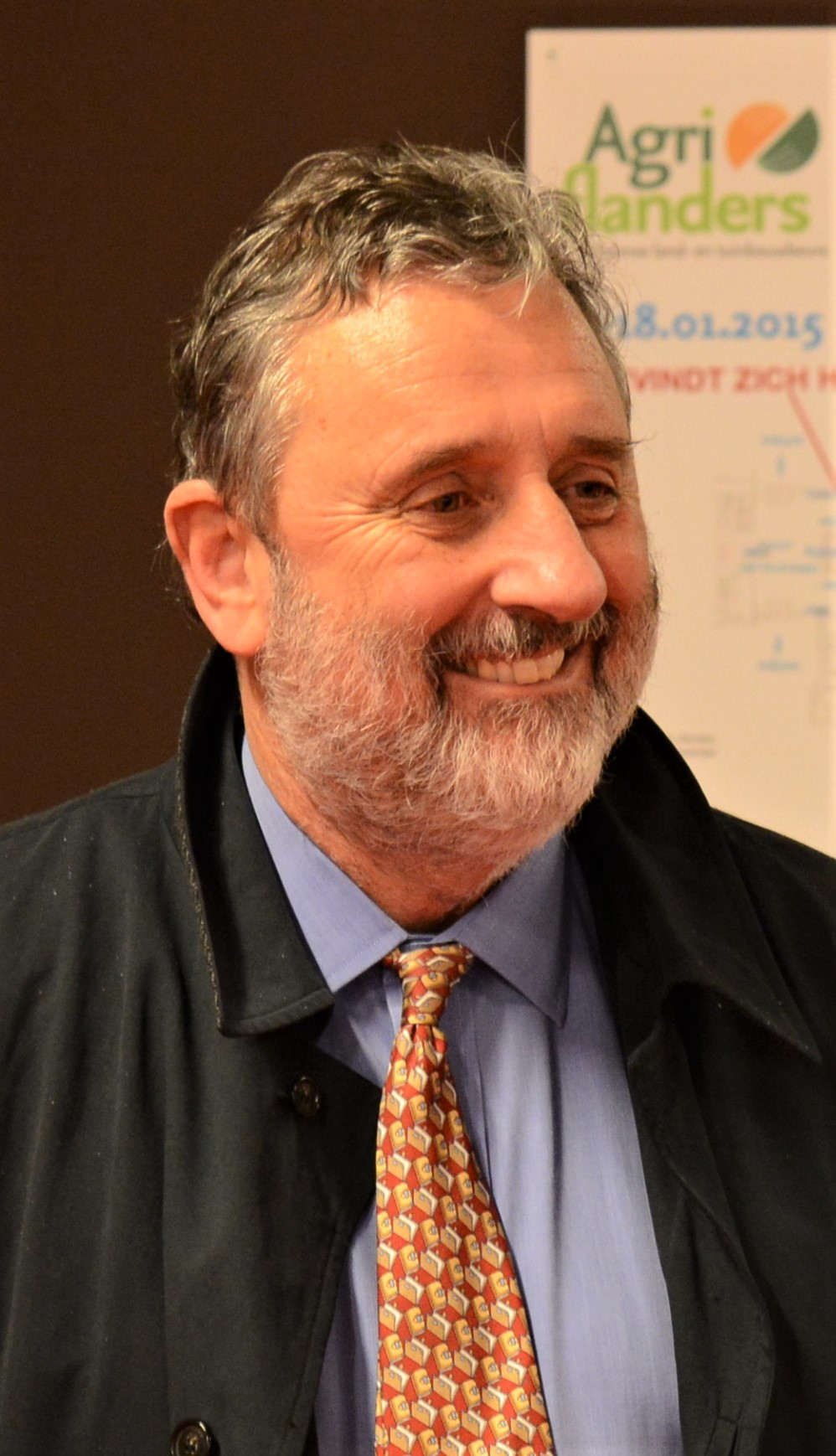
- Henne Schuwer (2015)

Ambassador of the Netherlands to the United States
- In office 17 September 2015 – 2019
- Preceded by: Rudolf Bekink
- Succeeded by: André Haspels

Ambassador of the Netherlands to Belgium
- In office 2010–2015

Personal details
- Born: Hendrik Jan Jurriaan Schuwer; 3 May 1953 (age 73) The Hague, Netherlands
- Education: Leiden University (LL.M.)

Hendrik Jan Jurriaan (Henne) Schuwer (born 3 May 1953) is a Dutch career diplomat who served as the ambassador to Belgium and to the United States.

== Biography ==
Schuwer was born on 3 May 1953 in The Hague, in the Netherlands. Both of his parents were initially journalists, while his father later became the head of public relations for Caltex. When his mother became a teacher in Bilthoven, he moved there and attended secondary school. After graduating in 1972, he enrolled at Leiden University, where he received a Master of Laws in 1978.

That year, he joined the Dutch Ministry of Foreign Affairs and was first stationed at the embassy in Hanoi, Vietnam in 1979. In 1981, he became the second secretary at the embassy in New Delhi, India. Schuwer was then posted in Brussels, Belgium, as the first secretary of the Dutch permanent representation to the European Union. He then was assigned to the Dutch consulate in Los Angeles, California in 1988, where he worked on trade issues. He returned to The Hague in 1991, first as deputy director of the Foreign Ministry's European Integration Department and then as political director in 1995.

In 1997, Schuwer was stationed at the Dutch embassy in Washington, D.C. as a counselor for one year and then as the deputy chief of mission. He then returned to Brussels in 2002 as the deputy permanent representative of the Netherlands to the European Union, and then as the director of the private office of the NATO Secretary General in 2007. He spent the year of 2009 in The Hague as the director of the Dutch Foreign Ministry's North Africa and Middle East department.

In 2010, Schuwer became the ambassador of the Netherlands to Belgium. He remained in this position until 2015, when he was appointed the ambassador of the Netherlands to the United States. His term as ambassador to the United States came to an end in 2019.
