= Renée Jones-Bos =

Dutch civil servant and diplomat (born 1952)

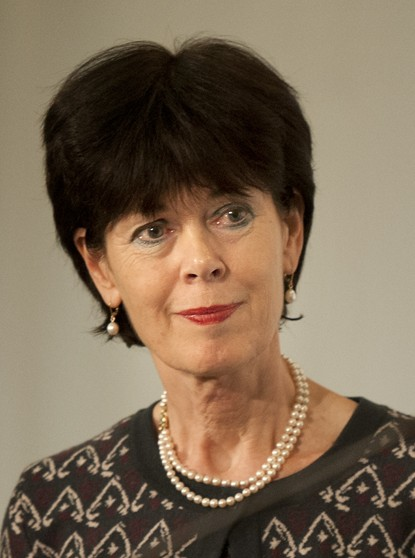
- Jones-Bos in 2014

Ambassador of the Netherlands to Russia
- In office September 2016 – August 2019
- Preceded by: Ron van Dartel
- Succeeded by: Rob Swartbol

Secretary-General at the Ministry of Foreign Affairs
- In office July 2012 – August 2016
- Preceded by: Ed Kronenburg
- Succeeded by: Joke Brandt

Ambassador of the Netherlands to the United States
- In office September 2008 – June 2012
- Preceded by: Christiaan Kröner
- Succeeded by: Rudolf Bekink

Personal details
- Born: Regina Veronica Maria Bos; 20 December 1952 (age 73) Oud-Beijerland, Netherlands
- Spouse: Richard Jones
- Children: 2
- Education: University of Sussex; University of Antwerp

Regina Veronica Maria "Renée" Jones-Bos (Dutch pronunciation: [reːˈɣinaː veːˈroːnikaː maːˈrijaː rəˈneː dʑoːnz ˈbɔs]; née Bos; born 20 December 1952) is a Dutch civil servant and diplomat. She served as Ambassador of the Netherlands to Russia from 2016 to 2019. Previously, Jones-Bos was Ambassador to the United States in Washington, D.C. (2007–2012) and Secretary-General at the Ministry of Foreign Affairs in The Hague (2012–2016).

== Early life and education ==
Jones-Bos was born on 20 December 1952 in Oud-Beijerland in the Netherlands, where she also grew up.

She holds a Masters of Arts degree in Russian Studies from the University of Sussex (United Kingdom) and a degree in Russian and English Studies, Politics and Economics from the University of Antwerp (Belgium).

== Career ==
Before joining the Dutch Ministry of Foreign Affairs, Jones-Bos worked as a translator/interpreter. She speaks French, German, Italian and Russian.

Jones-Bos has extensive experience in diplomacy and has steadily risen through the ranks of the Ministry of Foreign Affairs. From 1987 to 1990, she was First Secretary to the Embassy of the Netherlands in Washington. Prior to her appointment to Washington, Jones-Bos served as Director-General for Regional Policy and Consular Affairs, and as Ambassador-at-Large for Human Rights.

Jones-Bos also served as the Head of the Security Council Task Force of the Ministry of Foreign Affairs. Previous duties within the Ministry also included: Deputy Chief of Mission to the Royal Netherlands Embassy in Prague, Czech Republic; Head of Recruitment & Training; and postings in Dhaka, Bangladesh; Paramaribo, Suriname; and Moscow, USSR.

Jones-Bos has held several board positions throughout her career with many institutions including: the Supervisory Board of the Leiden University Medical Center; the Netherlands Society for International Affairs (NGIZ); the Advisory Board of the University of Tilburg; and the Selection Board of the Ministry of Foreign Affairs.

Jones-Bos served as the 44th Netherlands Ambassador to the United States from 2007 to 2012. She was the first female ambassador from the Netherlands to the United States. She presented her credentials to President George W. Bush on 18 September 2008. At the time, she said about her work:

"For more than 400 years, the Netherlands and the United States have been joined by the values of freedom, justice and an entrepreneurial spirit. A vibrant economic force, the Netherlands is also the third largest investor in America and a reliable trade and investment partner to the U.S. Together with my team at the Embassy and the Dutch Consulates General and Honorary Consuls in the U.S., we promote strong bilateral relations between the United States and the Netherlands in the areas of security and international law; food and nutrition; energy and climate; and water management."

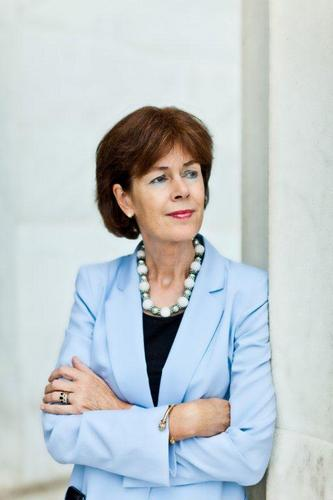
Jones-Bos in 2014

From 2012 to 2016, Jones-Bos was Secretary-General at the Ministry of Foreign Affairs in The Hague. She was named "the most influential woman in the Netherlands" by Dutch feminist monthly magazine Opzij in October 2012. In February 2013, she attended the opening of the opening of the new Erbil Embassy Liaison Office in Kurdistan, Iraq. On 30 April 30, 2013, she served as Herald-in-Chief during the inauguration of King Willem-Alexander of the Netherlands in the Nieuwe Kerk, Amsterdam.

From 2016 to 2019, Jones-Bos was the Netherlands Ambassador to Russia, presenting her credentials to President of Russia Vladimir Putin. In Moscow, she founded the Women Ambassadors Club. In October 2018, the Russian foreign ministry summoned her over what it described as a campaign of disinformation against Russia; Dutch authorities had previously said they had disrupted an attempt by Russian intelligence agents to hack the Organisation for the Prohibition of Chemical Weapons (OPCW), detaining and then expelling four men.

In March 2019, Jones-Bos led a delegation from the Netherlands to Uzbekistan. Jones-Bos retired from international diplomacy in August 2019.

On 17 June 2024, Jones-Bos was appointed Commander of the Order of Orange-Nassau, receiving the honour from Hanke Bruins Slot.

== Other activities ==
- Trilateral Commission, Member of the European Group

== Personal life ==
Jones-Bos and her husband, Richard Jones, have two children.
