= Herman van Roijen =

Dutch diplomat and politician (1905–1991)

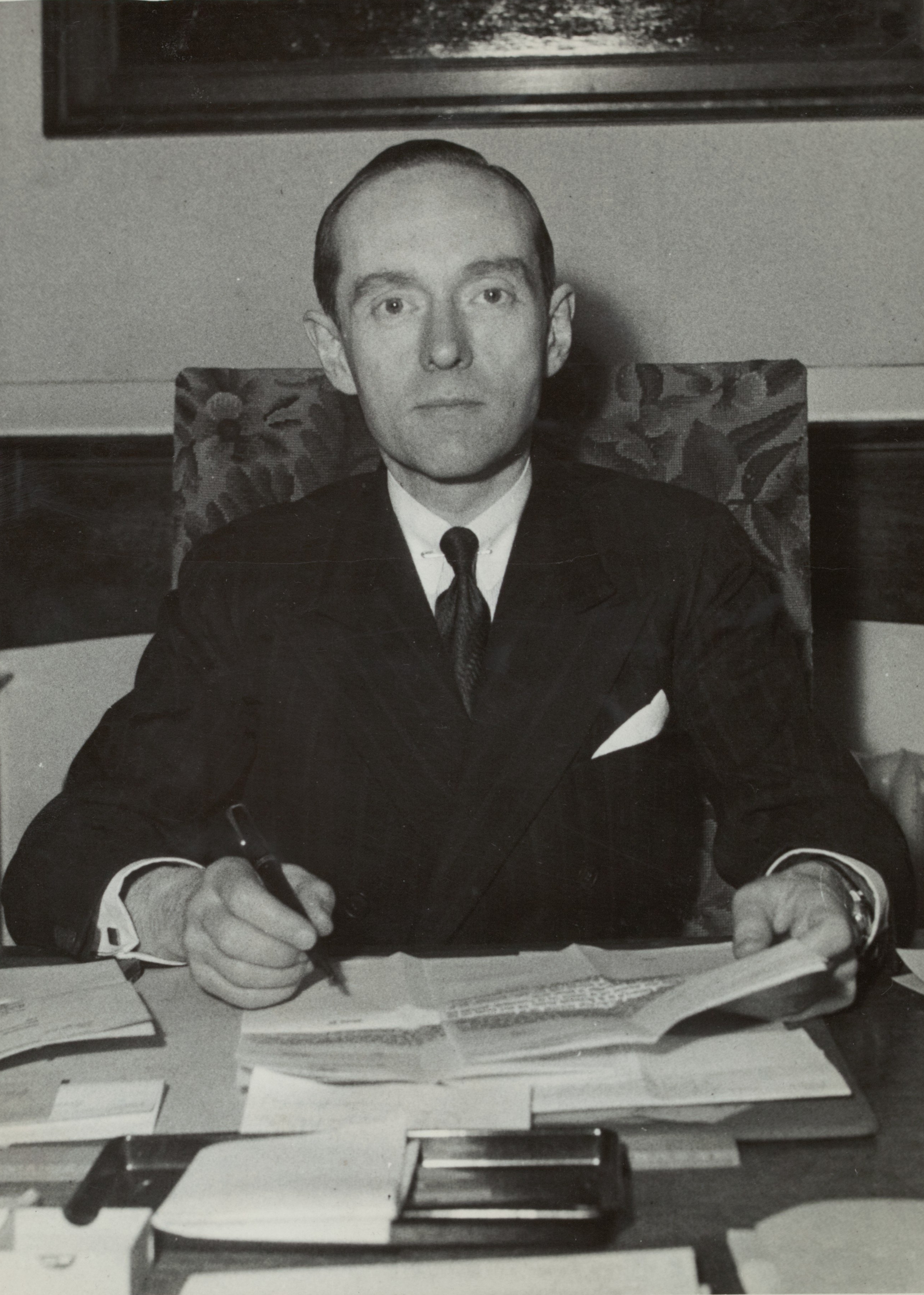
- Van Roijen in 1946

Ambassador of the Netherlands to the United Kingdom and Iceland
- In office 1 March 1964 – 1 May 1970
- Preceded by: Adolph Willem Carel van Schoonheeten
- Succeeded by: Willem Gevers

Ambassador of the Netherlands to the United States
- In office 19 September 1950 – 1 March 1964
- Preceded by: Eelco van Kleffens
- Succeeded by: Carl Schurmann

Ambassador of the Netherlands to Canada
- In office 1 April 1947 – 19 September 1950

Minister of Foreign Affairs
- In office 1 March 1946 – 3 July 1946
- Prime Minister: Willem Schermerhorn
- Preceded by: Eelco van Kleffens
- Succeeded by: Pim van Boetzelaer van Oosterhout

Minister without Portfolio
- In office 25 June 1945 – 1 March 1946
- Prime Minister: Willem Schermerhorn
- Preceded by: Edgar Michiels van Verduynen
- Succeeded by: Eelco van Kleffens

Personal details
- Born: Jan Herman van Roijen; 10 April 1905 Constantinople, Ottoman Empire
- Died: 16 March 1991 (aged 85) Wassenaar, Netherlands
- Party: Independent Social Democrat
- Other political affiliations: Labour Party (Non affiliated sympathizer)
- Spouse: Anne Snouck Hurgronje (m. 1928)
- Children: 2 sons and 2 daughters
- Parent(s): Herman van Roijen Sr. Albertina Taylor Winthrop
- Education: University of Utrecht (Bachelor of Laws, Master of Laws, Doctor of Law)
- Occupation: Politician; Civil servant; Diplomat; Jurist

Jan Herman van Roijen (10 April 1905 – 16 March 1991) was a Dutch diplomat and politician. He was Dutch foreign minister in 1946.

== Early life ==
Van Roijen was born in Constantinople on 10 April 1905. He was the son of Jan Herman van Roijen Sr (1871–1933) and the American-born Albertina Taylor Winthrop (1871–1934), who married in May 1904. When he was born, his father was a diplomat in Constantinople.

His maternal grandparents were banker Robert Winthrop and the former Kate Wilson Taylor (a daughter of Moses Taylor, a prominent railroad financier who served as president of National City Bank). Among his maternal family was uncle Beekman Winthrop, the Assistant Secretary of the Navy in the Taft Administration, and aunt Katharine Taylor Winthrop, the wife of U.S. Senator Hamilton Fish Kean.

He received a Ph.D. from the University of Utrecht.

== Career ==
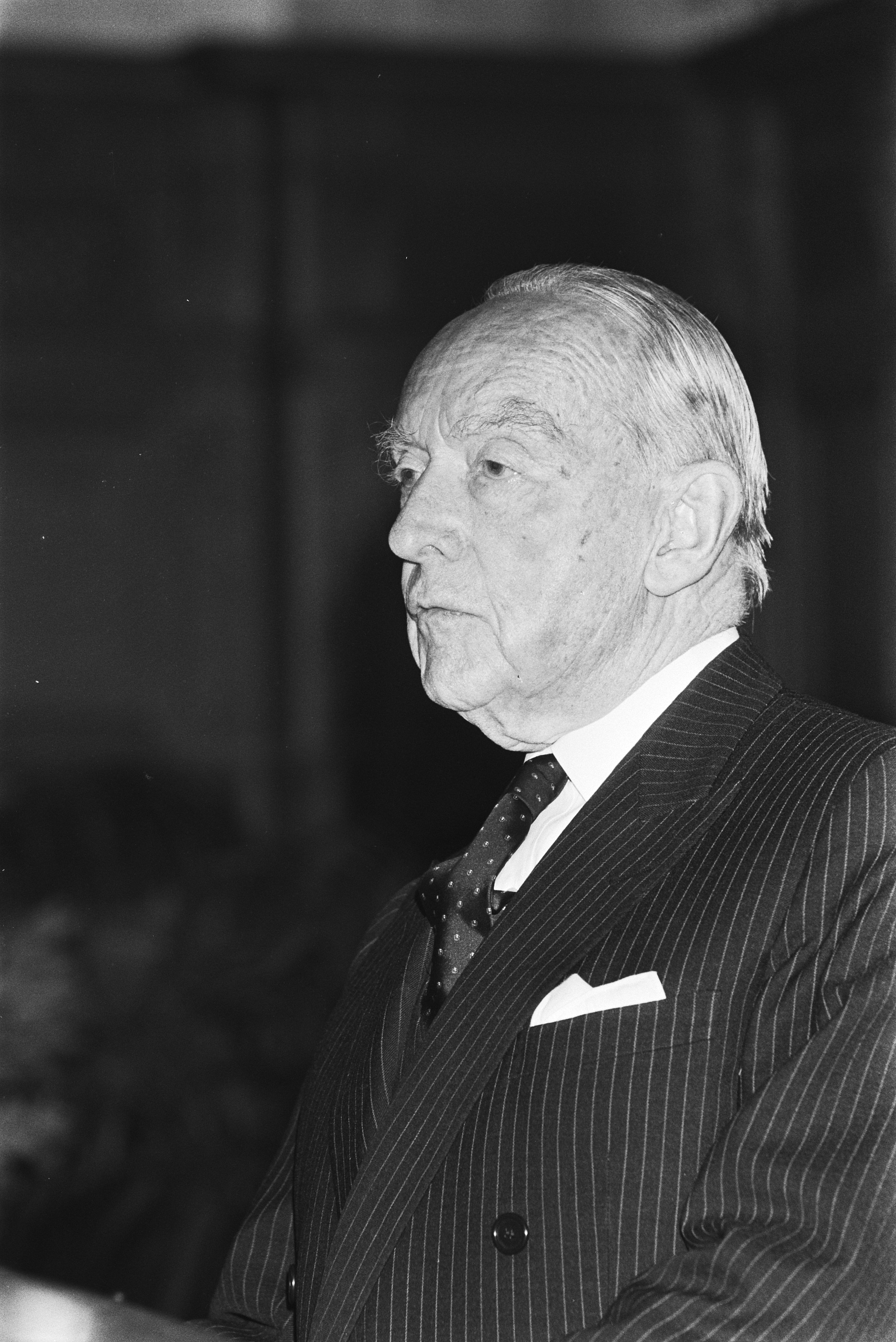
Receiving the Wateler Peace Prize, 1984.

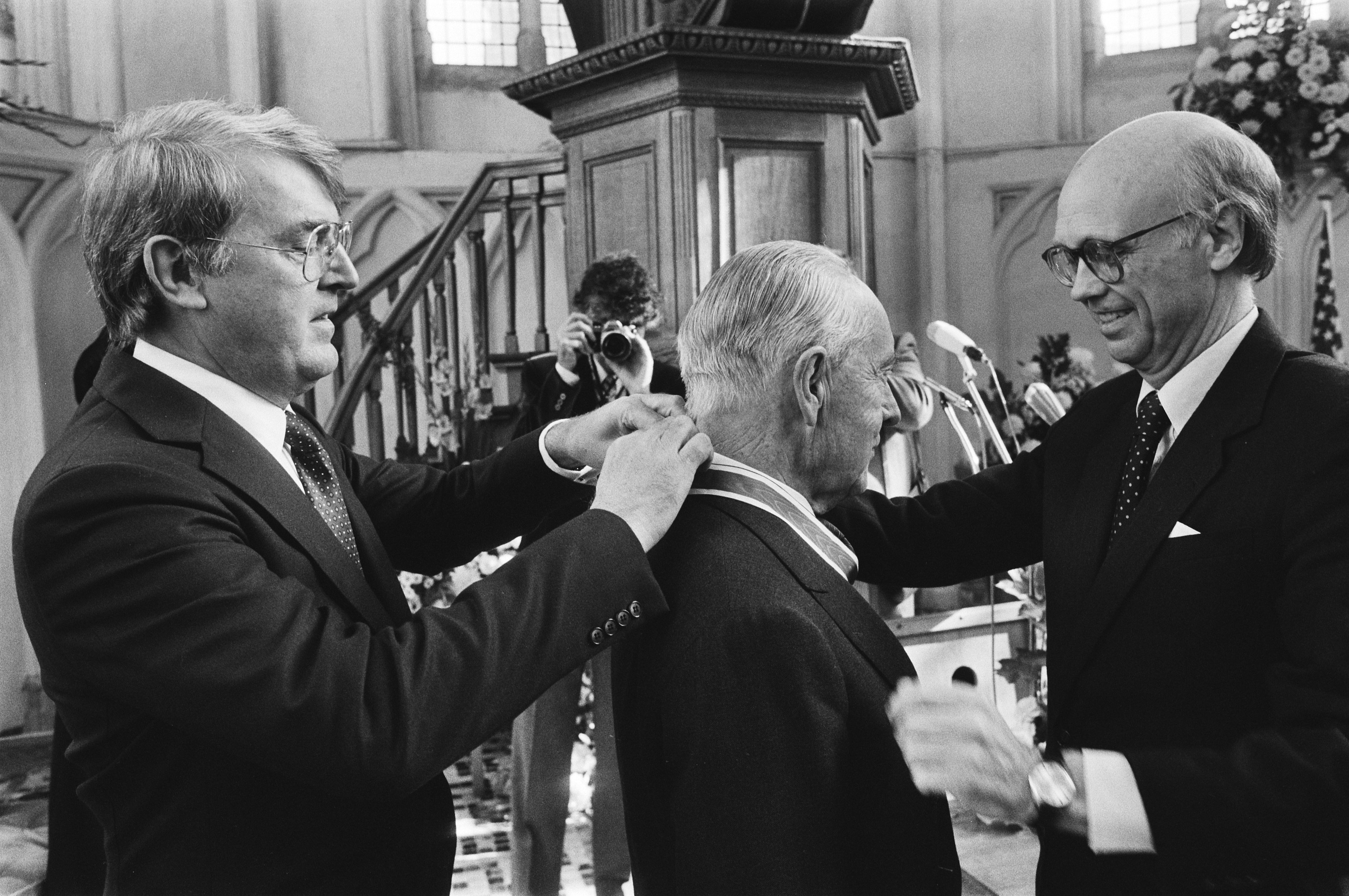
Van Roijen receiving the Freedom from Fear Award, 1982.

Van Roijen's diplomatic career began in the 1930s when he joined the Dutch Ministry of Foreign Affairs in 1930 and was an attache in Washington for three years. He also held positions in embassies in Tokyo as well as positions at the Ministry of Foreign Affairs in the Hague. In 1939, he was named head of the political division at the ministry.

Following the war, he represented the Netherlands at various conferences linked to the nascent United Nations, including the United Nations Conference on International Organization in San Francisco.

After his brief stint as the Dutch foreign minister, he was the ambassador to Canada (1947–1950), to the United States (1950–1964), and jointly to the United Kingdom and to Iceland (1964–1970).

=== Awards ===
In 1982 he received the inaugural Freedom from Fear Award and in 1984 he received the Wateler Peace Prize for his diplomatic efforts.

He received an Honorary Doctor of Civil Law from The University of Toledo on June 8, 1957.

== Personal life ==
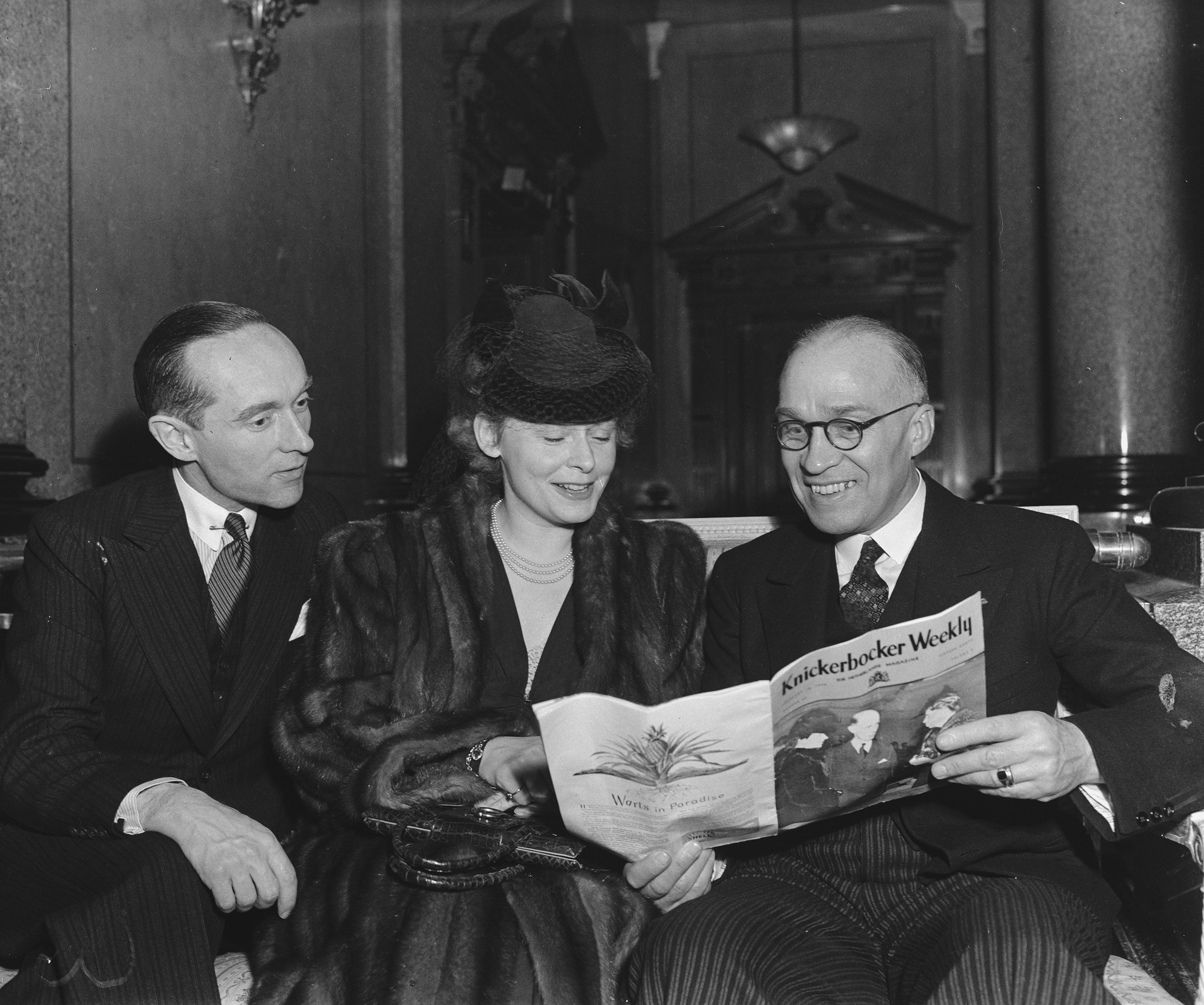
Van Roijen, his wife Anne, and Minister Logeman, 23 February 1946.

Van Roijen was married to Anne Snouck Hurgronje, a daughter of Aarnout Marinus Snouck Hurgronje. Together, they were the parents of two sons, Jan Herman and Willem, and two daughters, Tina van Notten and Digna van Karnebeek. While in America, they owned a 300-acre farm in Warrenton, Virginia.

He died, aged eighty-five, on 16 March 1991 at Wassenaar in South Holland.
