= Alexander Loudon =

Dutch diplomat (1892–1953)

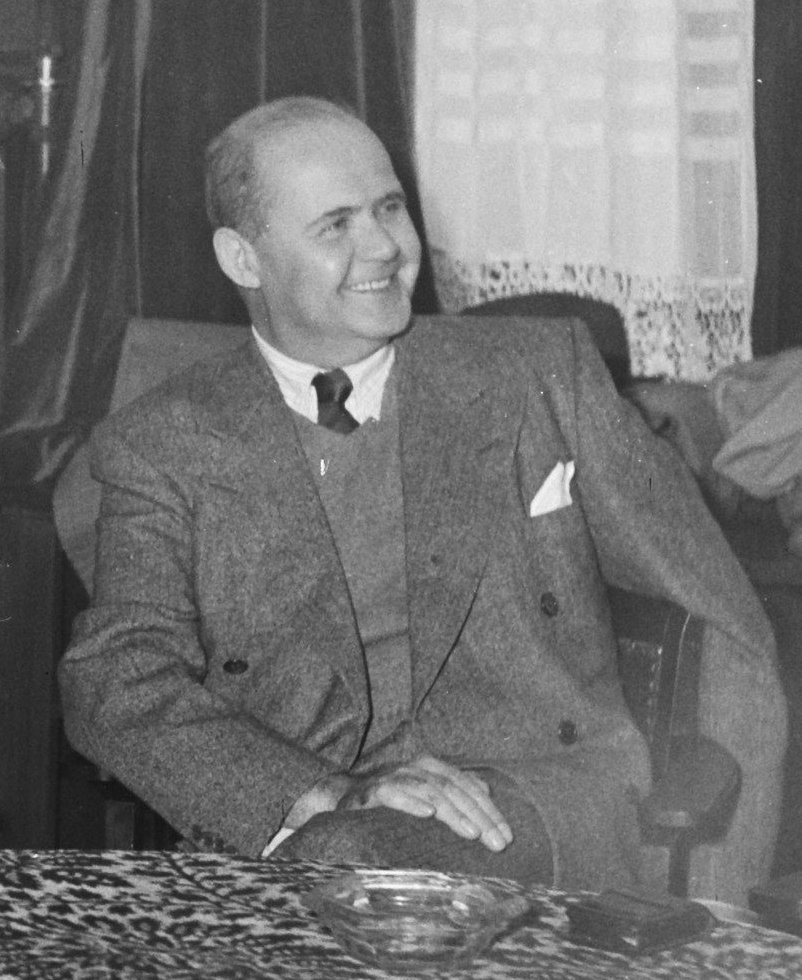
Alexander Loudon in 1945

Alexander Loudon (The Hague, 5 June 1892 – there, 4 February 1953) was a Dutch diplomat who served as envoy and later ambassador in Washington, D.C. during the Second World War, and later as a member of the Council of State.

Loudon was the son of Alexander Loudon and Henriette Françoise Eschauzier; his mother died 15 days after his birth. He studied law at Leiden University and entered the Dutch diplomatic service in 1916 as a candidate attaché at the Dutch legation in Sofia. He subsequently served at Dutch missions in London, Buenos Aires, Washington, Mexico City and Madrid.

From late 1932 he headed the Dutch legation in Lisbon, first as chargé d'affaires and from December 1934 as envoy. In 1938 he was appointed envoy in Bern, where he also served as permanent delegate to the League of Nations.

In December 1938 Loudon became head of the Dutch legation in Washington. After the German invasion of the Netherlands in May 1940, the Washington mission grew into the Netherlands' most important diplomatic post abroad, and on 8 May 1942 it was raised from a legation to an embassy, with Loudon becoming the first Dutch ambassador to the United States. During the war he was involved in efforts to present the Dutch position to the United States government and public, and he took part in discussions concerning the future of the Dutch overseas territories.

According to the Biografisch Woordenboek van Nederland, Loudon urged a realistic Dutch approach toward the United States and was one of the figures behind Queen Wilhelmina's speech of 7 December 1942 concerning the future of the overseas territories. He was also a member of the Dutch delegation at the United Nations Conference on International Organization in San Francisco in 1945, where he signed the Charter of the United Nations.

After leaving Washington, Loudon was appointed a member of the Council of State in 1947. In 1952 he became secretary-general of the Permanent Court of Arbitration, a post he held until his death in 1953.

After his return to the Netherlands, Loudon also held several positions in public and cultural life, including as chairman of the board of the Residentie Orkest and chairman of the Nederlands Genootschap voor Internationale Zaken.

== Family ==
Loudon was a member of the patrician Loudon family. He married Frédérique Christine Henriette Royaards in 1922; the marriage ended in divorce in 1933. In 1935 he married Beatrice Carpenter Cobb, with whom he had a son and a daughter.
