= André Haspels =

Dutch Ambassador to China

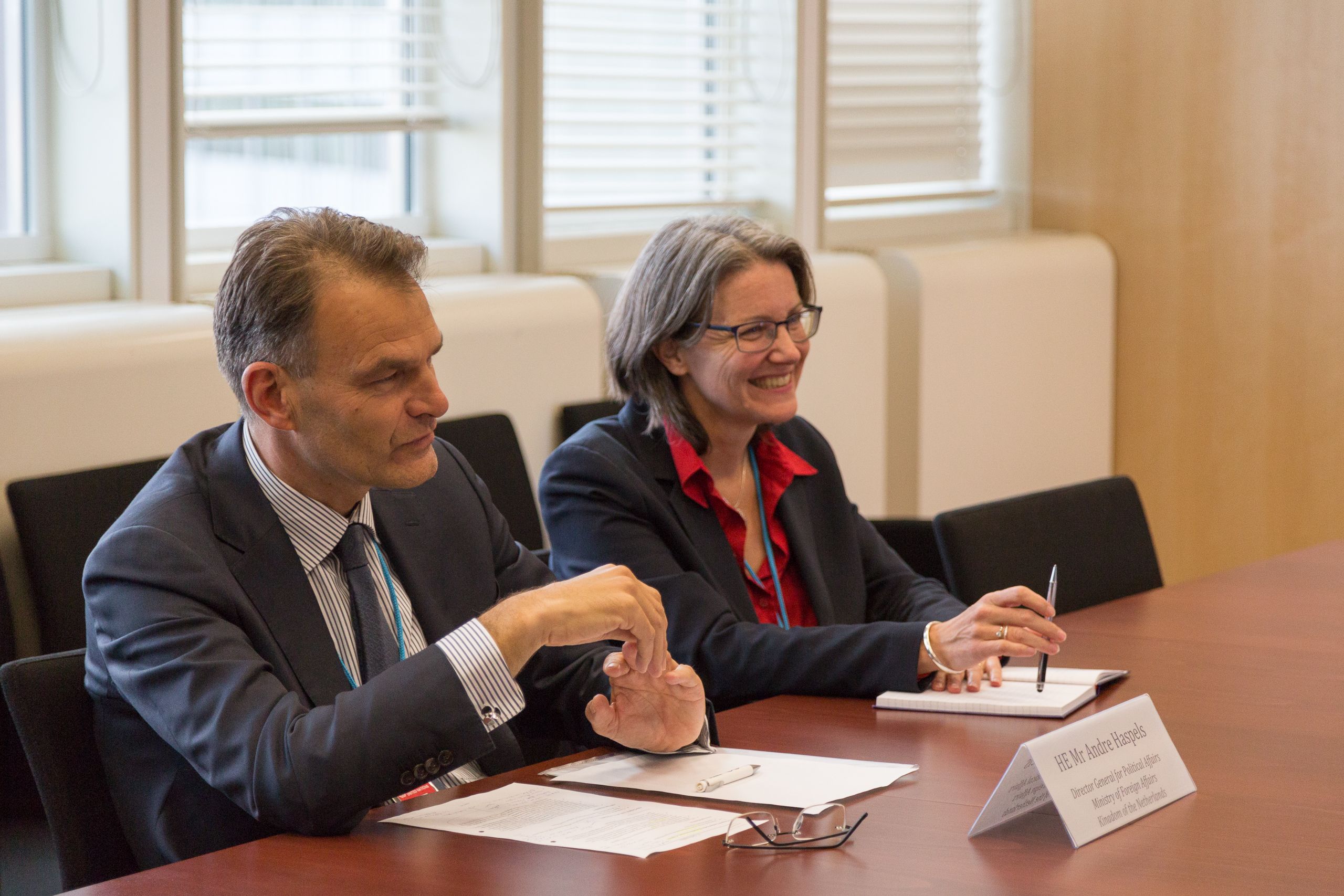
- Haspels (on the left) whilst serving as the Director General for Political Affairs

The Netherlands Ambassador to China
- Incumbent
- Assumed office September 11, 2023
- Preceded by: Wim Geerts

Ambassador of the Netherlands to United States
- In office 2019–2023
- Preceded by: Henne Schuwer

Ambassador of the Netherlands to South Africa
- In office 2011–2014

Ambassador of the Netherlands to Vietnam
- In office 2005–2008

Personal details
- Born: André Haspels; January 23, 1962 (age 64) Uithoorn, Netherlands
- Spouse: Bernie Grootenboer
- Children: 4

André Haspels (born January 23, 1962) is a Dutch diplomat currently serving as the Dutch Ambassador to China since 2023. He previously served as ambassador in Vietnam and South Africa and most recently as ambassador in the United States.

== Personal life and education ==
Haspels was born in Uithoorn, North Holland. His father was a flower merchant who bought flowers worldwide, including flowers from Florida. He completed pre-university education in 1982 and graduated from the Vrije Universiteit of Amsterdam with a degree in Political Science, specializing in International Relations. Haspels then joined the Ministry of Foreign Affairs in 1987 and followed its diplomatic service training program.

Haspels is married to Bernie Grootenboer and has four children: Lora, Sabine, Quinten and Alec.

== Career ==
Haspels joined the Ministry of Foreign Affairs in 1987, after completing the diplomatic service training program he worked as a Policy officer, at the Political and Economic Affairs Section at the embassy in Colombo, Sri Lanka from 1988 until 1990. From 1990 until 1992 he served as the Press secretary to Minister for European Affairs Piet Dankert, Ministry of Foreign Affairs, The Hague. From 1992 until 1994 he served as the Seconded National Expert (SNE) at the European Commission in Brussels, DG 23 (business policy/SMEs), following by a Secondment to the office of the Committee on International Policy/European Affairs at the House of Representatives from 1994 until 1996.

From 1997 until 2005 he served as the Head of the Political Department of the Dutch Embassy in South Africa (Pretoria) where he was involved in cooperation between the two countries, including in setting up the South African Truth Commission. From 2000 until 2005 he was the Head of the External Affairs Division of the European Integration Department (DIE), at the Ministry of Foreign Affairs.

From 2005 until 2008 Haspels served as the Dutch Ambassador to Vietnam.

From 2008 until 2009 he was the Director of the Sub‑Saharan Africa Department.

From 2009 until 2011 he was the Deputy Director-General for International Cooperation (Plv-DGIS).

In 2011 Haspels returned to South Africa, this time as the Dutch Ambassador to South Africa until 2014.

From 2014 until 2016 he was the Deputy Director-General for Political Affairs (Plv-DGPZ)

From 2016 until the summer of 2019 he was Director-General for Political Affairs, policy adviser to the Minister of Foreign Affairs in The Hague.

From September 16, 2019 until 2023, Haspels served as the Dutch Ambassador to the United States.

Since September 11, 2023, Haspels serves as the Dutch Ambassador to China.
