= Eelco van Kleffens =

Dutch politician and diplomat (1894–1983)

His Excellency Eelco van Kleffens
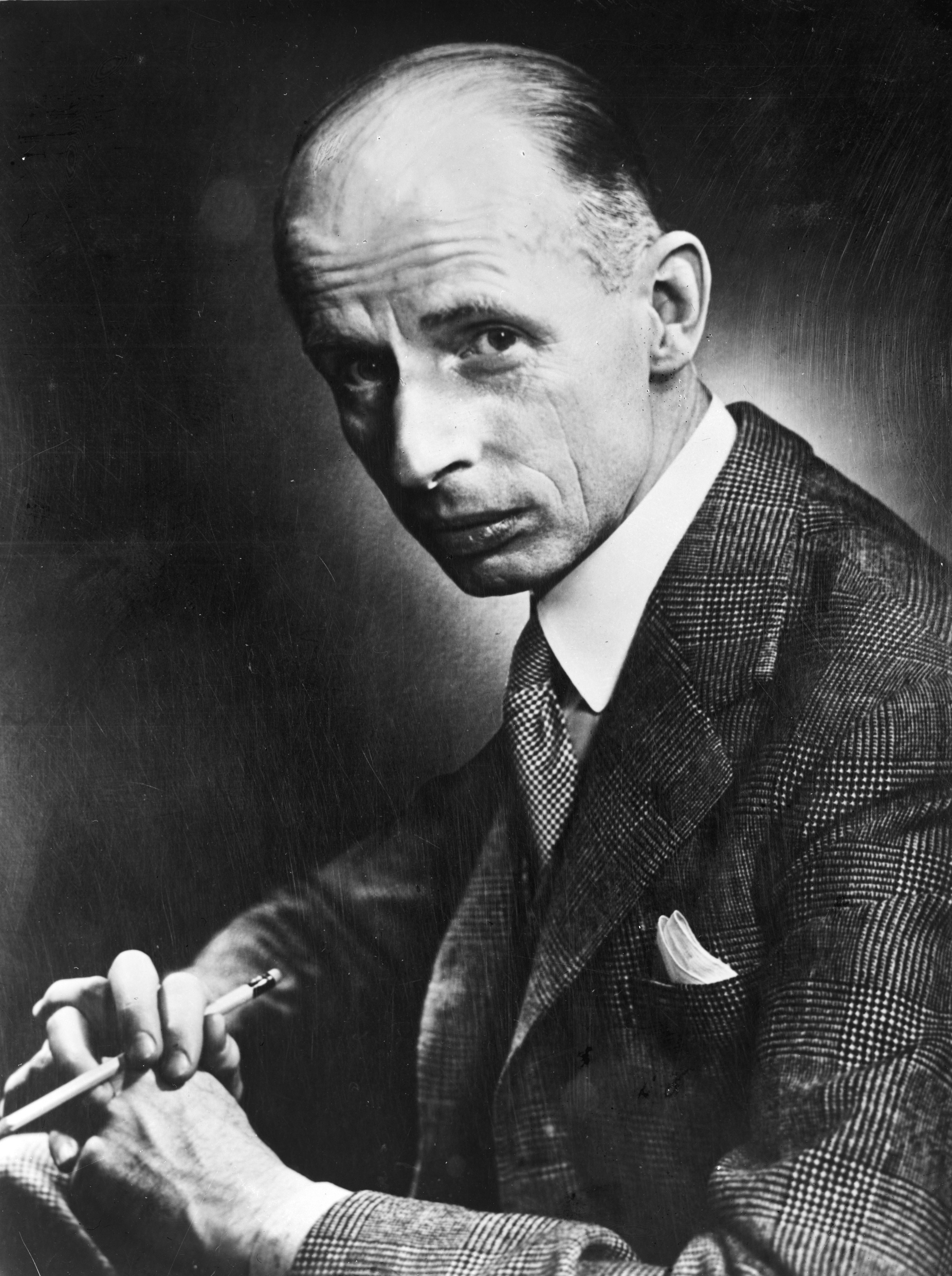
- Van Kleffens in 1945

Permanent Representative of the Netherlands to the ECSC
- In office 1 May 1958 – 10 December 1967
- Preceded by: Unknown
- Succeeded by: Unknown

Permanent Representative of the Netherlands to NATO and the OECD
- In office 1 December 1956 – 1 May 1958
- Preceded by: Unknown
- Succeeded by: Unknown

President of the United Nations General Assembly
- In office 1 January 1954 – 31 December 1954
- Preceded by: Vijaya Lakshmi Pandit
- Succeeded by: José Maza Fernández

Ambassador of the Netherlands to Portugal
- In office 1 January 1950 – 1 May 1958
- Preceded by: Unknown
- Succeeded by: Unknown

Ambassador of the Netherlands to the United States
- In office 1 July 1947 – 1 December 1956
- Preceded by: Unknown
- Succeeded by: Unknown

Permanent Representative of the Netherlands to the United Nations
- In office 17 January 1946 – 1 December 1956
- Preceded by: Office established
- Succeeded by: Unknown

Minister for United Nations Affairs
- In office 1 March 1946 – 1 July 1947
- Prime Minister: Willem Schermerhorn (1946); Louis Beel (1946–1947)
- Preceded by: Herman van Roijen
- Succeeded by: Joseph Luns (1952)

Minister of Foreign Affairs
- In office 10 August 1939 – 1 March 1946
- Prime Minister: See list: Dirk Jan de Geer (1939–1940) Pieter Sjoerds Gerbrandy (1940–1945) Willem Schermerhorn (1945–1946)
- Preceded by: Jacob Adriaan Patijn
- Succeeded by: Herman van Roijen

Personal details
- Born: Eelco Nicolaas van Kleffens; 17 November 1894 Heerenveen, Netherlands
- Died: 17 June 1983 (aged 88) Almoçageme, Portugal
- Spouse: Margaret Horstman (m. 1935)
- Education: Leiden University (Bachelor of Laws, Master of Laws); Erasmus University Rotterdam (Bachelor of Economics)
- Occupation: Politician · Diplomat · Civil servant · Jurist

Eelco Nicolaas van Kleffens (17 November 1894 – 17 June 1983) was a Dutch politician and diplomat.

== Biography ==
Eelco van Kleffens descended from an old Frisian family of public servants. He was the son of Henricus Cato and Jeannette Frésine (Veenhoven) van Kleffens. His younger brother Adrianus van Kleffens would later become a judge at the European Court of Justice. He married Margaret Helen Horstmann on 4 April 1935.

After receiving a Doctor of Laws degree from Leiden University, van Kleffens worked in the Secretariat of the League of Nations. He became secretary to the Directorate of Royal Dutch Petroleum Co. in 1920. He was appointed Assistant Director of the Legal Section of the Netherlands Ministry of Foreign Affairs in 1922 and of the Diplomatic Section in 1927, becoming Director of the latter in 1929. In the early 1930s he was also Secretary-General of The Hague Academy of International Law.

Van Kleffens was appointed the Minister of Foreign Affairs in 1939, weeks before World War II began, and was part of the Dutch government in exile over that period. During the war he penned an account of the German invasion named Juggernaut over Holland which was circulated within the occupied territory, and he was also one of the original signatories of the Benelux union.

Van Kleffens held the position of foreign minister until the Schermerhorn–Drees cabinet of 1946. Following his resignation from the ministerial position (but not from the cabinet) van Kleffens became the Netherlands' representative on the United Nations Security Council, and in 1947 was appointed the ambassador to the United States. In 1950 he became the ambassador to Portugal, and was bestowed the title of Minister of State, a prestigious honour.

In 1954 van Kleffens was appointed to the position of President of the United Nations General Assembly for that body's ninth session.

Van Kleffens was the Dutch representative at NATO and the Organisation for Economic Co-operation and Development from 1956 to 1958, and at the European Coal and Steel Community from 1958 until 1967, after which Van Kleffens retired to Portugal, where he died on 17 June 1983.

== Decorations ==
Honours
Ribbon bar	Honour	Country	Date	Comment
	Grand Officer of the Legion of Honour	France	12 February 1948	
	Knight Grand Cross of the Order of Orange-Nassau	Netherlands	30 April 1949	Elevated from Grand Officer (1 March 1946)
	Grand Cross of the Order of Merit	Portugal	1 October 1954	
	Commander of the Order of the Netherlands Lion	Netherlands	1 May 1958	Elevated from Knight (15 July 1931)
Honorific Titles
Ribbon bar	Honour	Country	Date	Comment
	Minister of State	Netherlands	4 July 1950	Style of Excellency

Political offices
Preceded by Jacob Adriaan Patijn	Minister of Foreign Affairs; 1939–1946	Succeeded by Herman van Roijen
Preceded by Herman van Roijen	Minister for United; Nations Affairs; 1946–1947	Succeeded by Joseph Luns (1952)
Diplomatic posts
Office established	Permanent Representative of the Netherlands to the United Nations; 1946–1956	Unknown
Unknown	Ambassador of the Netherlands to the United States; 1947–1956	Unknown
Unknown	Ambassador of the Netherlands to Portugal; 1950–1958	Unknown
Preceded by Vijaya Lakshmi Pandit	President of the United; Nations General Assembly; 1954	Succeeded by José Maza Fernández
Unknown	Permanent Representative of the Netherlands to NATO and the OECD; 1956–1958	Unknown
Unknown	Permanent Representative of the Netherlands to the ECSC; 1958–1967	Unknown
