= Pieter Johan van Berckel =

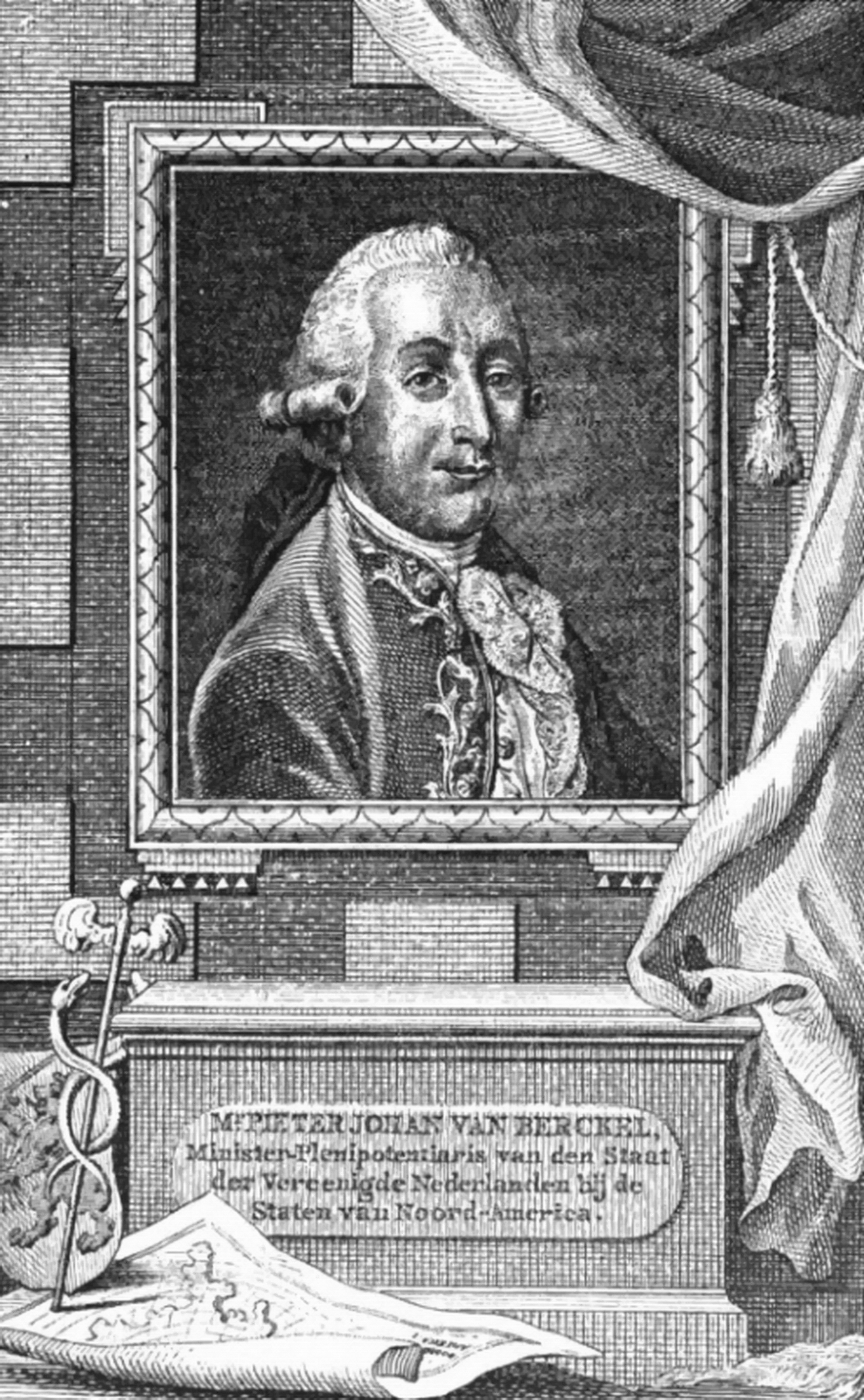
Pieter Johan van Berckel

Pieter Johan van Berckel (January 1725 - 27 December 1800) was a Dutch politician, who served as mayor of Rotterdam and the first ambassador from the Dutch Republic to the United States of America. He also remained part of the government of Rotterdam until 30 January 1788, when he was dismissed by William V, Prince of Orange and the Estates General of the Dutch Republic - he never returned to Rotterdam and remained a refugee, dying in Newark.

== Life ==
=== Early life ===
He was born in Rotterdam, as a son of Engelbert van Berckel, a bewindheber (managing director) of the Rotterdam Chamber of the VOC, and Theodora Petornella van Hogendorp. His brother was Engelbert François van Berckel. He studied law at the University of Utrecht. He married Geertruid Margaretha du Bois on 11 May 1757. They had seven children. His son Franco Petrus (1760-1836) succeeded him as Minister plenipotentiary at the United States of America (1789-1795).

=== Ambassador ===
Coat of Arms of Pieter Van Berckel

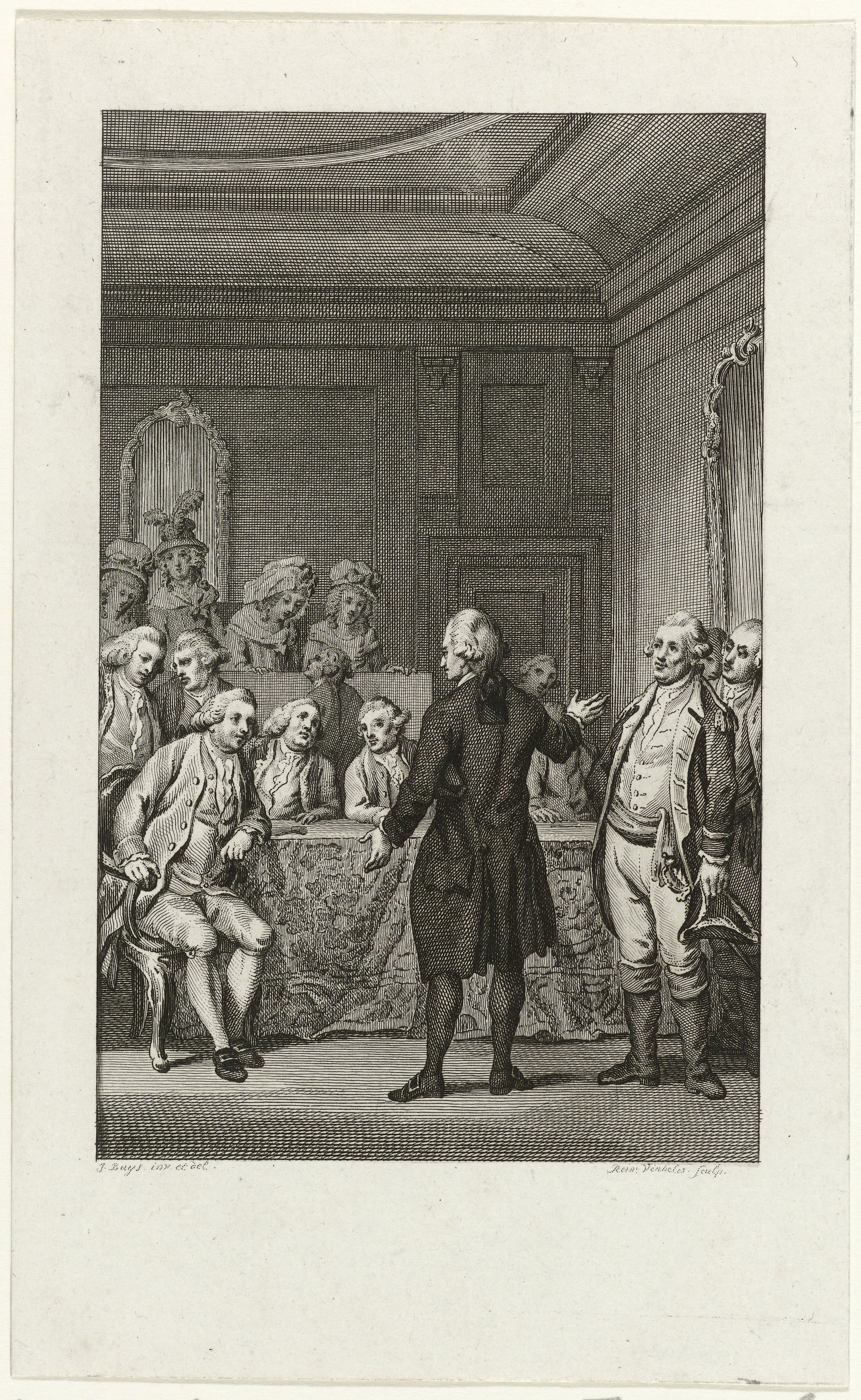
Pieter Johan van Berckel in Princetown on 31 October 1783

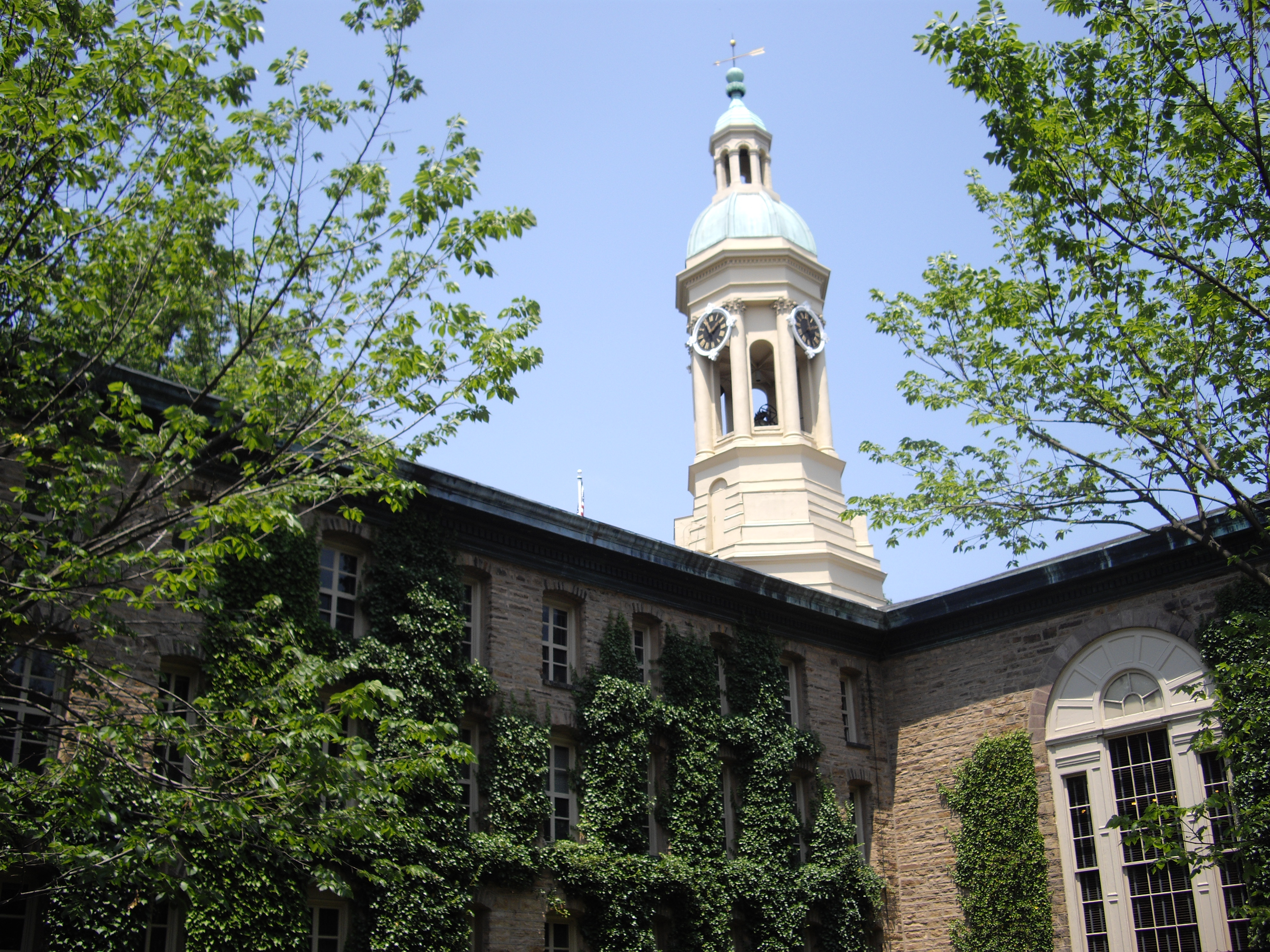
Nassau Hall

On 4 March 1783 Van Berckel was made the first minister plenipotentiary to the USA. He set off for Philadelphia on 25 June on the Overijssel, accompanied by Gijsbert Karel van Hogendorp, Carel de Vos van Steenwijk and Johan Willem Simon van Haersolte, serving as an officer or sailing as a passenger on one of four ships, which formed an escort squadron. Van Berckel sent a letter ahead ordering a six-horse carriage, along with two Amsterdam merchants who wanted to invest in the Bank of Pennsylvania. He arrived on 11 October and was housed in the best inn in the city.

Van Berckel and the large Dutch delegation had taken fifteen weeks to cross the Atlantic due to bad weather along the coast. One of the four ships, the warship De Erfprins (launched in 1770 by the Admiralty of Amsterdam) was wrecked 25 miles off Cape Cod. She lost two masts in a storm and was adrift for nine weeks at sea before sinking on 25 November in the Atlantic. 40 survivors from a crew of 350 were eventually picked up by a US brig.

No horse, carriage or house were ready for Van Berckel, all of which severely offended him, as did the fact that the Congress was no longer in Philadelphia - Princeton had only 75 houses but several good inns, sufficient to house the 22 congressmen during its four months as the US capital. Van Berckel spent the night with a local grandee. Handing in his credentials to the Congress of the Confederation was postponed by a day by president Elias Boudinot, a silversmith, to give time for preparations - the ceremony happened on 31 October at Nassau Hall, now the library of the University of Princeton.

In 1784, Van Berckel was elected a member of the American Philosophical Society in Philadelphia. On 3 December 1784 Van Berckel arrived in Trenton, New Jersey, then temporarily the US capital, though it lost that position because the southern states preferred a location south of the Mason–Dixon line. On 11 January 1785 he met John Jay, the USA's first foreign minister and a fierce opponent of slavery. In a letter to Jay on 13 February 1785 zette Van Berckel explained his view of the Kettle War. In 1788 he resigned as ambassador and the following year was succeeded by his son Franco Petrus. He took up a house on Wall Street.
