= Presidency of John Quincy Adams =

U.S. presidential administration from 1825 to 1829

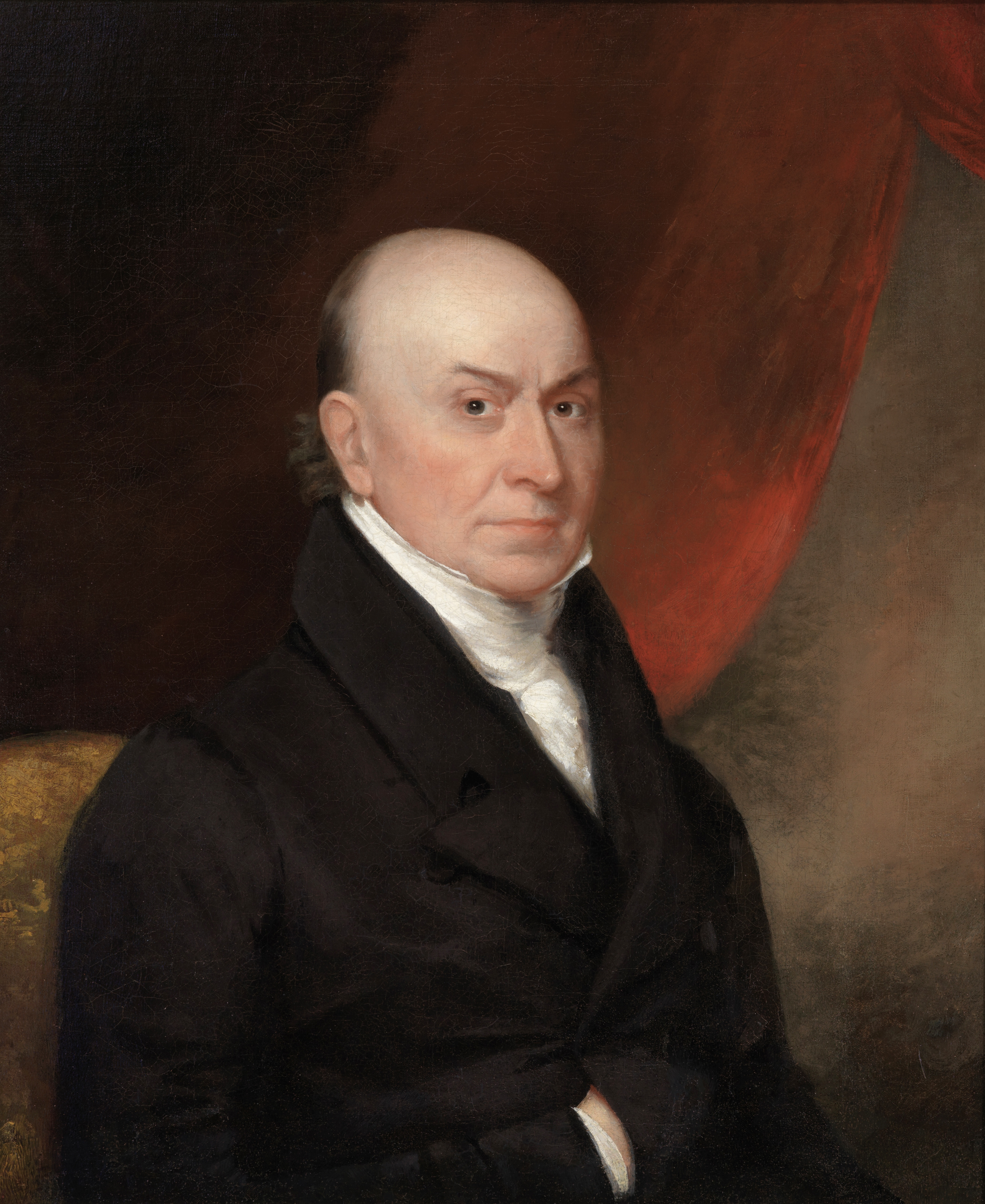
- Portrait, 1828
- Presidency of John Quincy Adams; March 4, 1825 – March 4, 1829
- Vice President: John C. Calhoun
- Cabinet: See list
- Party: Democratic-Republican (1825); National Republican (1825–1829)
- Election: 1824
- Seat: White House
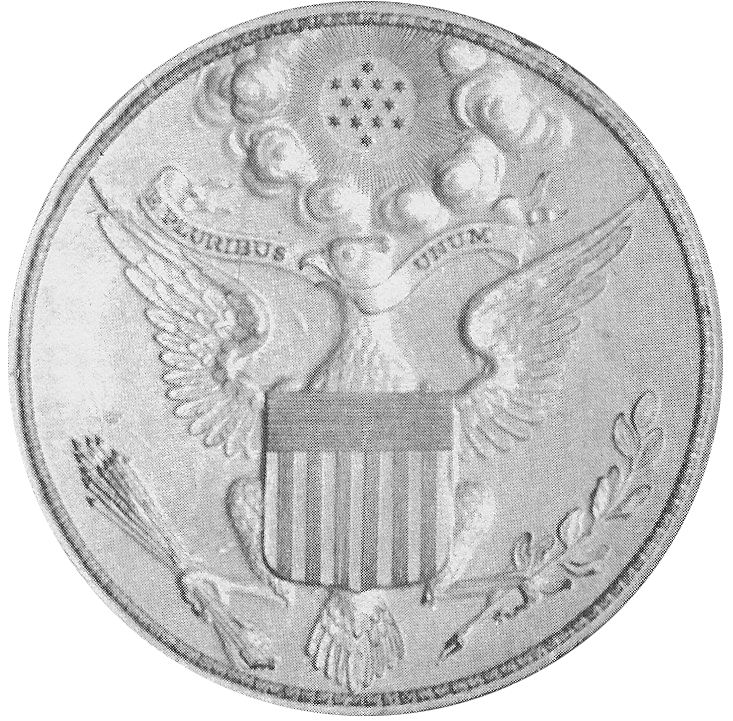
- Dorsett seal

John Quincy Adams served as the sixth president of the United States from March 4, 1825, to March 4, 1829. Adams took office following the 1824 presidential election, in which he and three other Democratic-Republicans—Henry Clay, William H. Crawford, and Andrew Jackson—sought the presidency. Adams was not a strong president, and was under continuous attack from Jackson, who defeated him in the 1828 presidential election.

No candidate won a majority of Electoral College votes in 1824, and so the United States House of Representatives chose the president in a contingent election. With the help of Clay, Adams was elected by the House. Adams appointed Clay to the prestigious role of Secretary of State, which many saw as a reward for helping to swing the election. Upon taking office, Adams articulated an ambitious domestic agenda. He envisioned a national marketplace in which North and South, town and country, were tied together by trade and exchange. A supporter of Henry Clay's proposed American System, he proposed major investments in internal improvements (involving the construction of roads and canals), and the creation of educational institutions such as a national university, among other initiatives, to bring this vision to life. Due to meager support from congressional leaders, however, his agenda was largely blocked by Congress. His support of the "Tariff of Abominations," a protective tariff approved by Congress in 1828, hurt his popularity among voters. The foreign affairs initiatives of the Adams administration fared only slightly better, as many of the president's key initiatives were blocked by Congress.

The contentious nature of the 1824 election brought about the demise of the Democratic-Republican Party and the emergence of a new era in American politics. Characterizing Adams's victory as the result of a "corrupt bargain" between Adams and Clay, Jackson and his supporters, including Martin Van Buren and Vice President John C. Calhoun, spent the ensuing three years constructing the organization that would become the modern Democratic Party. The followers of Adams organized themselves more loosely as the National Republican Party, but were unable to match the efforts of the Democrats under Jackson, who won the 1828 election in a landslide.

== Presidential election of 1824 ==
1824 presidential election results

The Federalist Party had nearly collapsed in the aftermath of the War of 1812, and all of the major presidential candidates in the 1824 presidential election were members of outgoing President James Monroe's Democratic-Republican Party. As the election approached, Adams, Speaker of the House Henry Clay, Secretary of War John C. Calhoun, and Secretary of the Treasury William H. Crawford all positioned themselves to succeed Monroe, and Monroe would remain neutral during the election. Immediately upon becoming Secretary of State in 1817, Adams had emerged as one of Monroe's most likely successors, as the last three presidents had all led the State Department at some point prior to taking office. Adams felt that his own election as president would vindicate his father, one-term former President John Adams, while also allowing him to pursue an ambitious domestic program. His popular appeal lay primarily in his tenure as secretary of state, during which time he had negotiated agreements with Russia, Britain, and Spain; each of those agreements were either conducive towards or led directly to U.S. expansion in North America. Though he lacked the charisma of his competitors, Adams was widely respected, and his candidacy benefited from his status as the lone Northerner in the race.

Crawford favored state sovereignty and a strict constructionist view of the Constitution, while Calhoun, Clay, and Adams all embraced federally-funded internal improvements, high tariffs, and the national bank. As 1824 approached, General Andrew Jackson jumped into the race, motivated in large part by his anger over Clay and Crawford's denunciations of his actions in Spanish Florida during the First Seminole War. While the other candidates based their candidacies on their long tenure as congressmen, ambassadors, or members of the cabinet, Jackson's appeal rested on his military service, especially in the Battle of New Orleans. During his sporadic service in Congress, Jackson had not earned a reputation for advocating any particular policies, though he had voted for the General Survey Act of 1824, a measure designed to help establish a national infrastructure network. Many of Jackson's backers attacked the alleged corruption of the federal government and emphasized that Jackson, unlike the other candidates, had not taken part in that corruption. Seeing the strength of Jackson's candidacy, Calhoun dropped out of the presidential race and instead sought the vice presidency.

The congressional nominating caucus had decided upon previous Democratic-Republican presidential nominees, but it had become largely discredited by 1824. Candidates were instead nominated by state legislatures or nominating conventions, and Adams received the endorsement of several New England legislatures. The regional strength of each candidate played an important role in the election; Adams was popular in New England, Clay and Jackson were strong in the West, and Jackson and Crawford competed for the South, despite the latter's health problems. In the 1824 presidential election, Jackson won a plurality in the Electoral College, taking 99 of the 261 electoral votes, while Adams won 84, Crawford won 41, and Clay took 37. Jackson won also won plurality of the national popular vote, although six states did not hold a popular vote for president. As no candidate won a majority of the electoral vote, the House was required to hold contingent election under the terms of the Twelfth Amendment. The House would decide among the top three electoral vote winners, with each state's delegation having one vote; thus, unlike his three rivals, Clay was not eligible to be elected by the House.

1825 contingent presidential election vote distribution
States for Adams	States for Jackson	States for Crawford
Connecticut; Illinois; Kentucky; Louisiana; Maine; Maryland; Massachusetts; Missouri; New Hampshire; New York; Ohio; Rhode Island; Vermont	Alabama; Indiana; Mississippi; New Jersey; Pennsylvania; South Carolina; Tennessee	Delaware; Georgia; North Carolina; Virginia
Total: 13 (54%)	Total: 7 (29%)	Total: 4 (17%)

Adams knew that his own victory in the contingent election would require the support of Clay, who wielded immense influence in the House of Representatives. Though they were quite different in temperament and had clashed in the past, Adams and Clay shared similar views on national issues. By contrast, Clay viewed Jackson as a dangerous demagogue, and he was unwilling to support Crawford due to the latter's health issues. Adams and Clay met prior to the contingent election, and Clay agreed to support Adams in the contingent election.

On February 9, 1825, Adams won the contingent election on the first ballot, taking 13 of the 24 state delegations. He was the second president elected by the House of Representatives, following Thomas Jefferson in the 1800 election. Adams won the House delegations of all the states in which he or Clay had won a majority of the electoral votes, as well as the delegations of Illinois, Louisiana, and Maryland. After the election, many of Jackson's supporters claimed that Adams and Clay had reached a "Corrupt Bargain" in which Adams promised Clay the position of Secretary of State in return for Clay's support.

== Inauguration ==
Adams was sworn in as president by Chief Justice John Marshall on March 4, 1825, in a ceremony held in the House of Representatives Chamber at the United States Capitol. He took the presidential oath upon a volume of Constitutional law instead of the more traditional Bible. In his inaugural address, Adams adopted a post-partisan tone, promising that he would avoid party-building and politically motivated appointments. He also proposed an elaborate program of internal improvements: roads, ports, and canals. Though some questioned the constitutionality of such federal projects, Adams argued that the General Welfare Clause provided for broad constitutional authority. While his predecessors had engaged in projects like the building of the National Road, Adams promised that he would ask Congress to authorize many more such projects.

== Administration ==
Adams cabinet
Office	Name	Term
President	John Quincy Adams	1825–1829
Vice President	John C. Calhoun	1825–1829
Secretary of State	Henry Clay	1825–1829
Secretary of the Treasury	Richard Rush	1825–1829
Secretary of War	James Barbour	1825–1828
Peter Buell Porter	1828–1829
Attorney General	William Wirt	1825–1829
Secretary of the Navy	Samuel L. Southard	1825–1829

Like Monroe, Adams sought a geographically balanced cabinet that would represent the various party factions, and he asked the members of the Monroe cabinet to remain in place for his own administration. Samuel L. Southard of New Jersey stayed on as Secretary of the Navy, while William Wirt, who had strong ties to both Virginia and Maryland, kept his post of Attorney General. John McLean of Ohio continued to serve as the Postmaster General, an important position that was not part of the cabinet. Southard and McLean both had favored Calhoun and Jackson in 1824, while Wirt generally shied away from becoming involved in electoral politics.

Adams chose Henry Clay as Secretary of State, angering those who believed that Clay had offered his support in the 1824 election for the most prestigious position in the cabinet. Though Clay would later regret accepting the position since it reinforced the "Corrupt Bargain" accusation, Clay's strength in the West and interest in foreign policy made him a natural choice for the top cabinet position. Adams's first choices for Secretary of War and Secretary of the Treasury were Andrew Jackson and William Crawford, respectively. As Jackson was uninterested in serving in the Adams administration, Adams selected James Barbour of Virginia, a prominent supporter of Crawford, to lead the War Department. After Crawford declined to continue his tenure as Secretary of the Treasury, Adams asked Albert Gallatin to take the position, but Gallatin also declined. Leadership of the Treasury Department instead went to Richard Rush of Pennsylvania, who was out of the country and had not taken part in the 1824 election. Rush became a prominent advocate of internal improvements and protective tariffs. Adams presided over a harmonious and productive cabinet. He met with the cabinet as a group on a weekly basis to discuss major issues of policy, and he gave individual cabinet members a great deal of discretion in carrying out their duties.

In terms of ambassadors, President Adams made or kept the following appointments:

- United Kingdom:
  - Rufus King (to 1826)
  - Albert Gallatin (to 1827)
  - James Barbour
- France:
  - James Brown (holdover from previous administration)
- Spain:
  - Alexander Hill Everett
- Netherlands:
  - Christopher Hughes (Chargé d'affaires)
- Portugal:
  - Thomas L.L. Brent (Chargé d'affaires)
- Russia and Prussia: none

== Judiciary ==
Adams appointed one justice to the Supreme Court of the United States and eleven judges to the United States district courts. The first vacancy of Adams's tenure arose upon the death of Associate Justice Thomas Todd in February 1826. To replace Todd, Adams nominated another Kentuckian, Robert Trimble, who was the first federal judge elevated to the Supreme Court. After deliberating for a month, the Senate confirmed Trimble in a 27-to-5 vote. Trimble died in 1828 at the age of 52, creating another vacancy on the court. After Charles Hammond and Clay both declined appointment, Adams nominated Senator John J. Crittenden of Kentucky. Adams made the nomination in December 1828, and the Jacksonians of the lame-duck Senate refused to confirm Crittenden, leaving a vacancy for Jackson to fill.

== Domestic affairs ==
=== Ambitious agenda ===
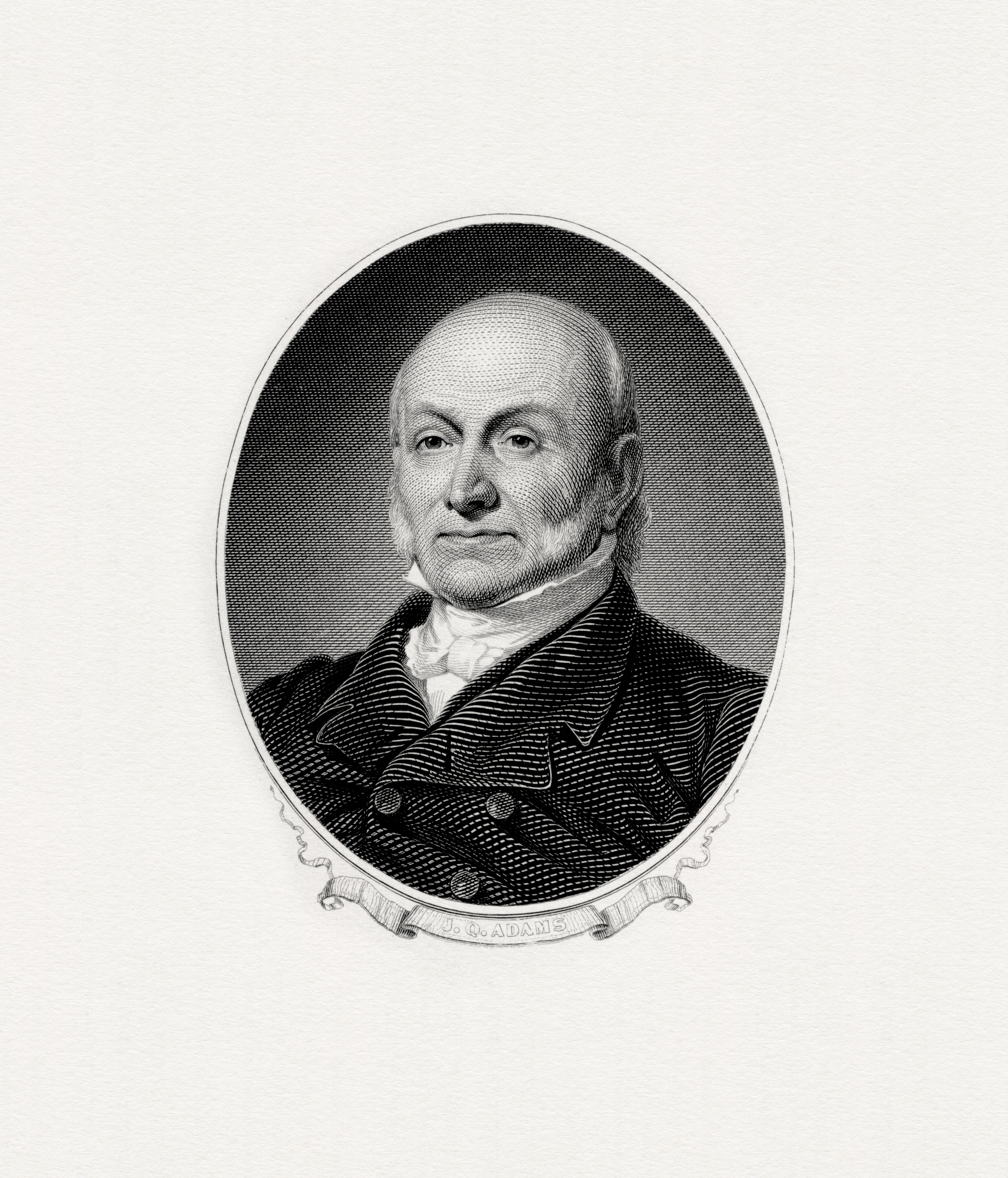
BEP engraved portrait of Adams as president

In his 1825 annual message to Congress, Adams presented a comprehensive and ambitious agenda. He called for major investments in internal improvements as well as the creation of a national university, a naval academy, and a national astronomical observatory. Noting the healthy status of the treasury and the possibility for more revenue via land sales, Adams argued for the completion of several projects that were in various stages of construction or planning, including a road from Washington to New Orleans. He also proposed the establishment of a Department of the Interior as a new cabinet-level department that would preside over these internal improvements. Adams hoped to fund these measures primarily through Western land sales, rather than increased taxes or public debt. The domestic agenda of Adams and Clay, which would come to be known as the American System, was designed to unite disparate regional interests in the promotion of a thriving national economy.

Adams's programs faced opposition from various quarters. Many disagreed with his broad interpretation of the constitution and preferred that power be concentrated in state governments rather than the federal government. Others disliked interference from any level of government and were opposed to central planning. Some in the South feared that Adams was secretly an abolitionist and that he sought to subordinate the states to the federal government.

Clay warned the president that many of his proposals held little chance of passage in the 19th Congress, but Adams noted that his agenda might be adopted at some point in the future. As Clay predicted, most of the president's proposals were defeated in Congress. Adams's ideas for a national university, national observatory, and the establishment of a uniform system of weights and measures never received congressional votes. His proposal for the creation of a naval academy won the approval of the Senate, but was defeated in the House in an 86-to-78 vote. Opponents of the naval academy objected to its cost and worried that the establishment of such an institution would "produce degeneracy and corruption of the public morality." Adams's proposal to establish a national bankruptcy law was also defeated. Secretary of the Navy Southard proposed a national survey of the eastern coastline of the United States, but Congress refused to approve of the project, approving only of smaller surveys in South Carolina and Maryland. The administration also attempted to launch a naval expedition to explore the Pacific Ocean, but this too was blocked by Congress.

=== Internal improvements ===
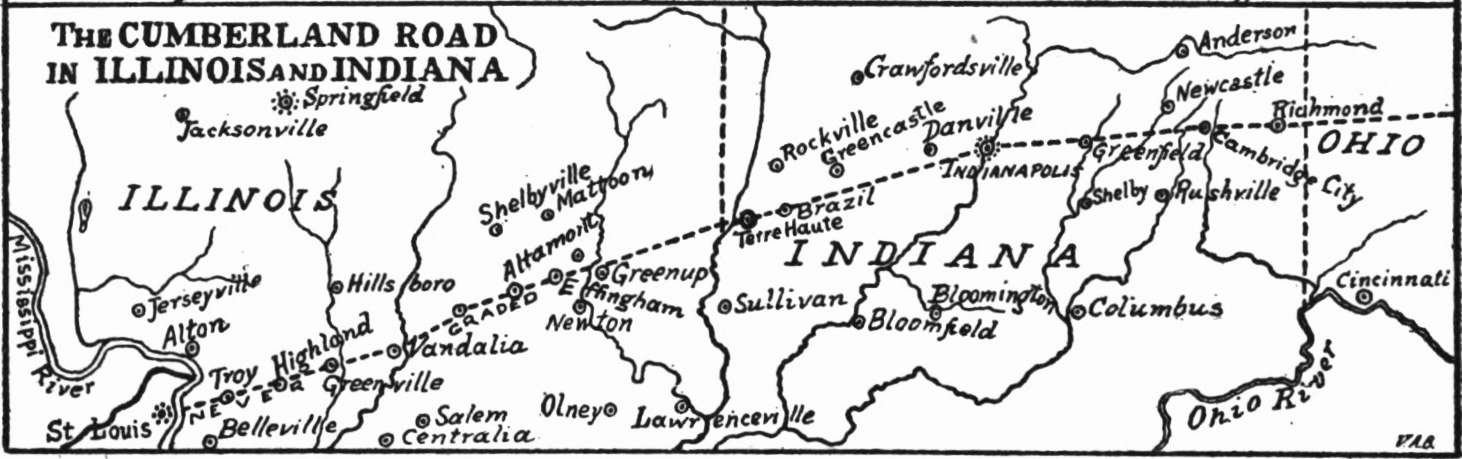
Cumberland Road (National Road) in Illinois and Indiana

Unlike other aspects of his domestic agenda, Adams won congressional approval for several ambitious infrastructure projects. Between 1824 and 1828, the United States Army Corps of Engineers conducted surveys for a bevy of potential roads, canals, railroads, and improvements in river navigation.

Adams presided over major repairs and further construction on the National Road, and shortly after he left office the National Road extended from Cumberland, Maryland to Zanesville, Ohio. The Adams administration also saw the beginning of the Chesapeake and Ohio Canal; the construction of the Chesapeake and Delaware Canal and the Louisville and Portland Canal around the falls of the Ohio; the connection of the Great Lakes to the Ohio River system in Ohio and Indiana; and the enlargement and rebuilding of the Dismal Swamp Canal in North Carolina. Additionally, the first passenger railroad in the United States, the Baltimore and Ohio Railroad, was constructed during Adams's presidency.

In September 1827, while Adams was vising Massachusetts, he toured a mill owned by Benjamin Bussey on Mother Brook. (Note: Adams would serve as one of the executors of Bussey's estate.) The Dedham Woolen Mill was one of the first companies in the country to undertake the entire process of taking raw material and producing textiles in a single mill.

Though many of these projects were undertaken by private actors, the government provided money or land to aid in the completion of many of those projects. The projects undertaken by the Adams administration in and around Ohio proved to be particularly important, as those projects enabled rapid development in Pittsburgh, Cincinnati, Cleveland, and Louisville.

=== Formation of political parties ===
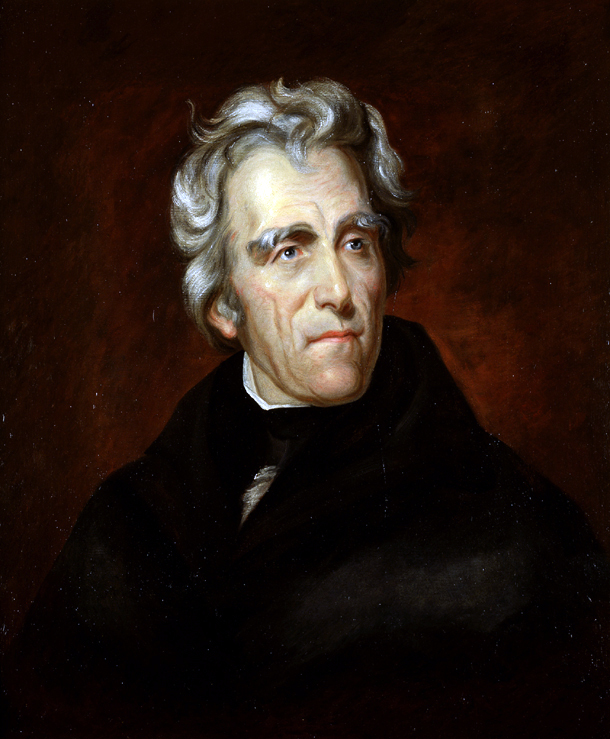
General Andrew Jackson

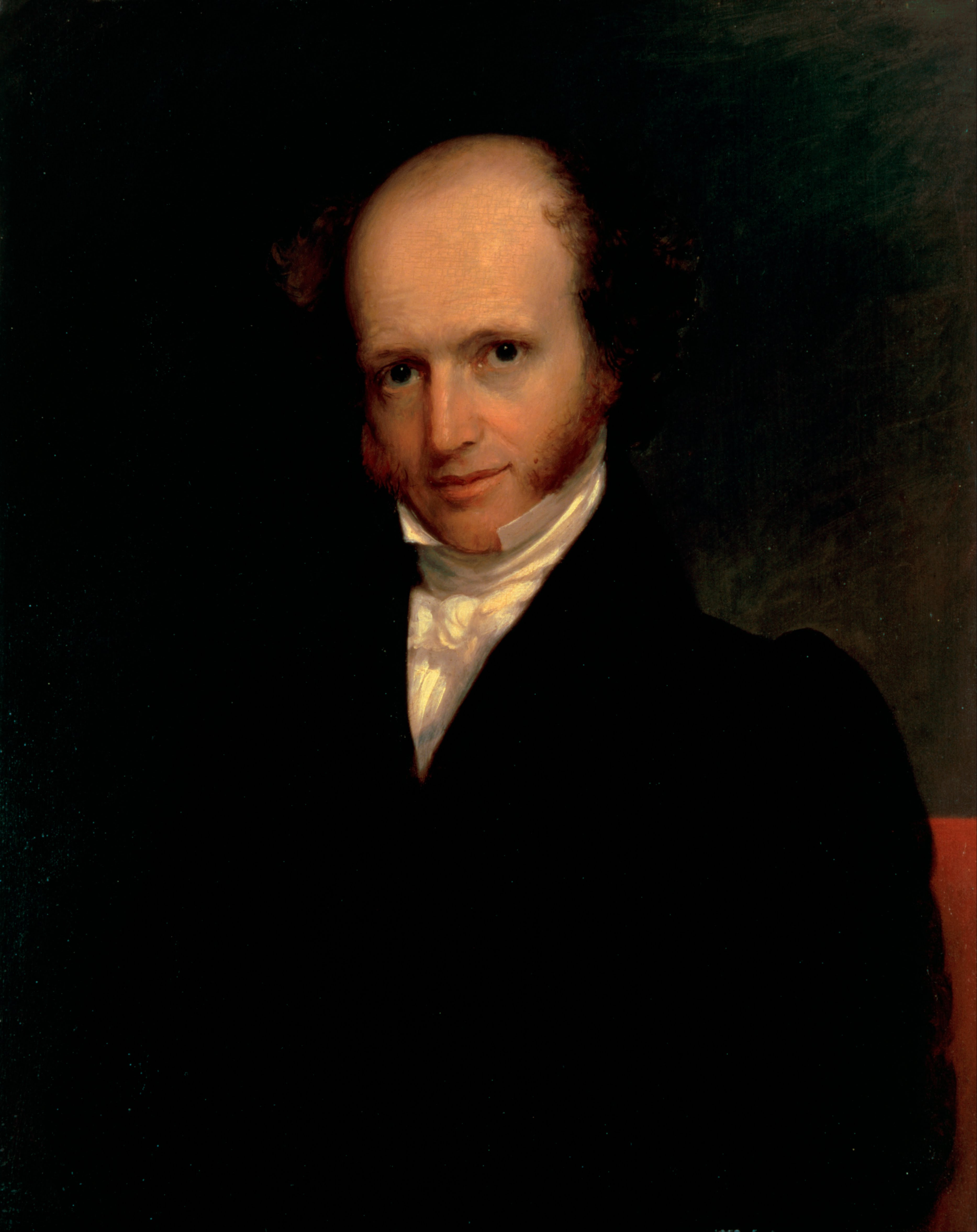
Senator Martin Van Buren

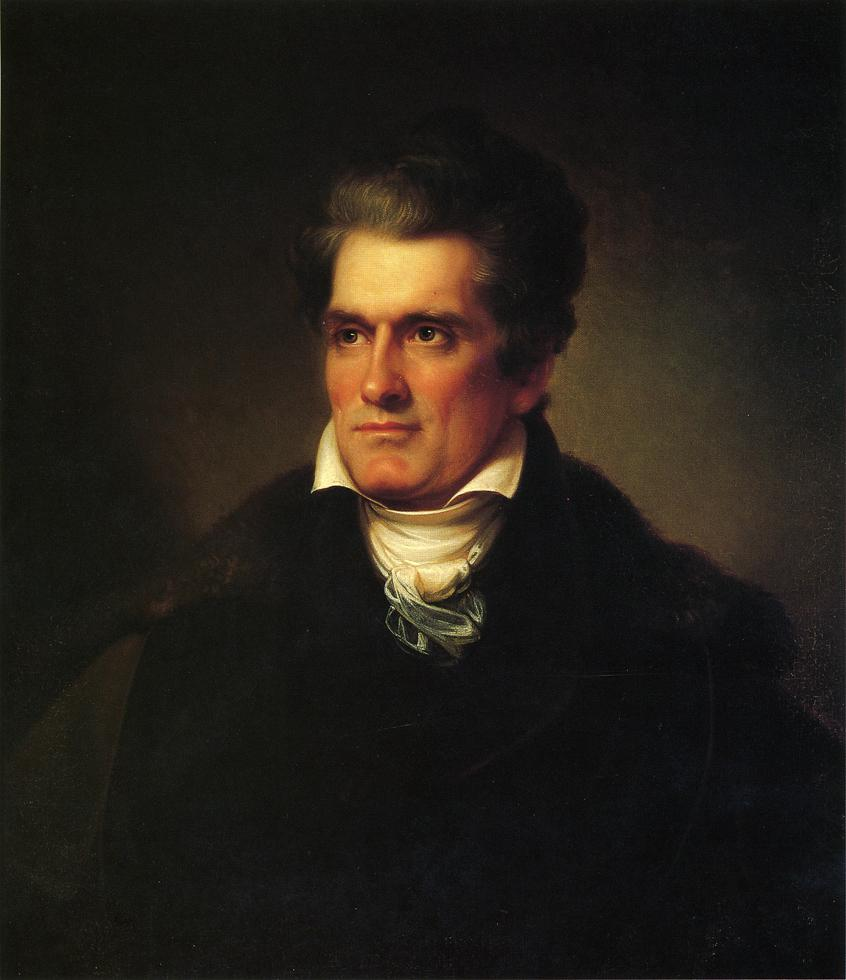
Vice President John C. Calhoun

In the immediate aftermath of the 1825 contingent election, Jackson was gracious to Adams. Adams hoped to continue Monroe's goal of ending partisanship, and his cabinet included individuals of various ideological and regional backgrounds. Nevertheless, Adams's appointment of Clay rankled Jackson, who received a flood of letters encouraging him to run, and in 1825 Jackson accepted the Tennessee legislature's nomination of him for president in the next election. The appointment of Clay also drew opposition from supporters of Crawford and Calhoun. Though he had been close with Adams during Monroe's presidency, Calhoun was politically alienated from the president by the appointment of Clay, which established Clay as the natural heir to Adams. Denmark Vesey's failed slave rebellion in 1822 also contributed to a shift in Calhoun's politics, and he would become an increasingly ardent advocate of the doctrine of states' rights during the 1820s.

Adams's ambitious December 1825 annual message to Congress galvanized the opposition, with important figures such as Francis Preston Blair of Kentucky and Thomas Hart Benton of Missouri breaking with the Adams administration. By the end of the first session of the 19th United States Congress, an anti-Adams congressional coalition consisting of Jacksonians (led by Benton and Hugh Lawson White), Crawfordites (led by Martin Van Buren and Nathaniel Macon), and Calhounites (led by Robert Y. Hayne and George McDuffie) had emerged. Aside from Clay, Adams lacked strong supporters outside of the North, and Edward Everett, John Taylor, and Daniel Webster served as his strongest advocates in Congress. Supporters of Adams began calling themselves National Republicans, while supporters of Jackson began calling themselves Democrats. In the press, they were often described as "Adams Men" and "Jackson Men."

In the 1826 elections, Adams's opponents picked up seats throughout the country, as allies of Adams failed to coordinate among themselves. Following those elections, Van Buren met with Calhoun, and the two agreed to throw their support behind Jackson in 1828, with Van Buren bringing along many of Crawford's supporters. Calhoun hoped to succeed Jackson in either 1832 or 1836. Van Buren's ultimate goal, meanwhile, was the revival of the Jefferson-era alliance between Southern planters and the "plain Republicans" of the North, which in turn would help recreate the old partisan split between Democratic-Republicans and Federalists. Drawing on the recent debate over the Missouri Compromise, Van Buren feared that the failure to create a two-party system would leave the country split by sectional, rather than partisan, issues.

Unlike Van Buren, Adams clung to the hope of a non-partisan nation, and he refused to make full use of the power of patronage to build up his own party structure. Many of his appointments were designed to mollify critics rather than to reward supporters. He attempted to woo former Federalists like Rufus King, but internal divisions among the Federalists, as well as the continuing unpopularity of Federalists among Democratic-Republicans, prevented Adams from winning their full support. Adams also failed to rally strong support from the fledgling Anti-Masonic movement or from the followers of influential New York Governor DeWitt Clinton. Outside of New England, many of the administration's supporters defined themselves more in their opposition to Jackson than in their support of Adams.

While Jackson had wide support, and many thought that the election had been unfairly stolen from him, he lacked an ideological platform to unite the opponents of Adams. For fear of upsetting the delicate balance among his supporters, Jackson avoided taking any strong positions other than his opposition to the Adams administration. Supporters in the West hoped that Jackson would invest in internal improvements and Pennsylvanians hoped he would favor a high tariff. But at the same time, many Southerners saw Jackson as a beacon of opposition to a powerful federal government, which they feared would eventually be used against slavery. Though Jackson did not articulate a detailed political platform in the same way that Adams did, his coalition was united in opposition to Adams's reliance on government planning. The Jacksonians also tended to favor the opening of Native American lands to white settlement.

On 4 July 1826, former president and John Quincy Adams's father John Adams, and former President Thomas Jefferson died, notably on the same day. Adams signed his second executive order on July 11, mourning the death of the former presidents and ordering the national flag to wave at half-mast. He would not sign any further executive orders until February 28, 1828, announcing the death of Major General Jacob Brown.

=== Tariff of 1828 ===
Allies of Adams lost control of Congress after the 1826 mid-term elections, and pro-Adams Speaker of the House John Taylor was replaced by Andrew Stevenson, a Jackson supporter. Adams himself noted that the U.S. had never before seen a Congress that was firmly under the control of political opponents of the president. During the first half of his administration, Adams avoided taking a strong stand on tariffs, partly because he wanted to avoid alienating his allies in the South and New England. While New England manufacturing interests supported protective tariffs, the region's shipping interests generally opposed them. Southerners, meanwhile, had largely abandoned attempts to industrialize, preferring instead to focus on growing cotton. Clay's home state of Kentucky and other parts of the South favored tariffs, but most Southerners strongly supported low tariffs and free trade.

After Jacksonians took power in 1827, they devised a tariff bill designed to appeal to Western states while instituting high rates on imported materials important to the economy of New England. The bill passed the House in a 105-to-94 vote; administration allies voted 61-to-35 in favor of the bill, while a comfortable majority of Jacksonians voted against it. It is unclear whether Van Buren, who shepherded the bill through Congress, meant for the bill to pass, or if he deliberately designed it in such a way that, he hoped, would force Adams and his allies to oppose it. Regardless, Adams signed the Tariff of 1828, which became known as the "Tariff of Abominations." Adams was denounced in the South, but he received little credit for the tariff in the North. The high tariff rates would eventually lead to the Nullification Crisis of the 1830s.

=== Indian policy ===
Adams sought the gradual assimilation of Native Americans via consensual agreements, a priority shared by few whites in the 1820s. Yet Adams was also deeply committed to the westward expansion of the United States. Settlers on the frontier, who were constantly seeking to move westward, cried for a more expansionist policy that disregarded the concerns of Native Americans. Early in his term, Adams suspended the Treaty of Indian Springs after learning that the Governor of Georgia, George Troup, had forced the treaty on the Muscogee. Adams signed a new treaty with the Muskogee in January 1826 that allowed the Muskogee to stay but ceded most of their land to Georgia. Troup refused to accept its terms, and authorized all Georgian citizens to evict the Muscogee. A showdown between Georgia and the state government was only averted after the Muscogee agreed to a third treaty. Though many saw Troup as unreasonable in his dealings with the federal government and the Native Americans, the administration's handling of the incident alienated those in the Deep South who favored immediate Indian removal.

== Foreign affairs ==
=== Trade and claims ===
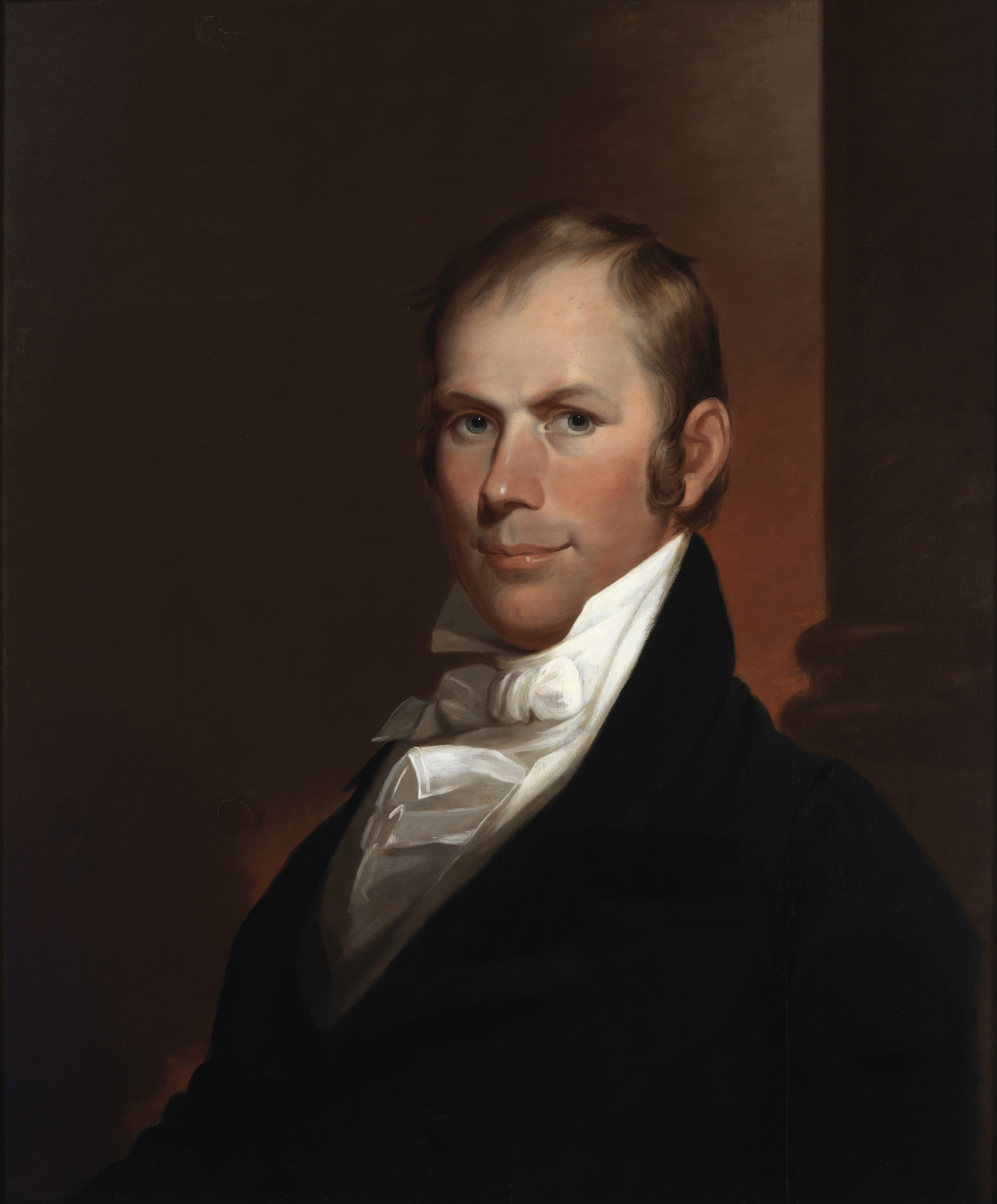
Secretary of State Henry Clay

One of the major foreign policy goals of the Adams administration was the expansion of American trade. His administration reached reciprocity treaties with a number of nations, including Denmark, the Hanseatic League, the Scandinavian countries, Prussia, and the Federal Republic of Central America. The administration also reached commercial agreements with the Kingdom of Hawaii and the Kingdom of Tahiti. Adams also renewed existing treaties with Britain, France, and the Netherlands, and began negotiations with Austria, the Ottoman Empire, and Mexico that would all lead to successful treaties after Adams left office. Collectively, these commercial treaties were designed to expand trade in peacetime and preserve neutral trading rights in wartime.

Adams sought to reinvigorate trade with the West Indies, which had fallen dramatically since 1801. Agreements with Denmark and Sweden opened their colonies to American trade, but Adams was especially focused on opening trade with the British West Indies. The United States had reached a commercial agreement with Britain in 1815, but that agreement excluded British possessions in the Western Hemisphere. In response to U.S. pressure, the British had begun to allow a limited amount of American imports to the West Indies in 1823, but U.S. leaders continued to seek an end to Britain's protective Imperial Preference system. In 1825, Britain banned U.S. trade with the British West Indies, dealing a blow to Adams's prestige. The Adams administration negotiated extensively with the British to lift this ban, but the two sides were unable to come to an agreement. Despite the loss of trade with the British West Indies, the other commercial agreements secured by Adams helped expand overall volume of U.S. exports.

The Adams administration settled several outstanding American claims that arose from the Napoleonic Wars, the War of 1812, and the Treaty of Ghent. He viewed the pursuit of these claims as an important component in establishing U.S. freedom of trade. Gallatin, in his role as ambassador to Britain, convinced the British to agree to an indemnity of approximately $1 million. The U.S. also received smaller indemnities from Sweden, Denmark, and Russia. The U.S. sought a large indemnity from France, but negotiations broke down after the government of Jean-Baptiste de Villèle collapsed in 1828. Clay and Adams were also unsuccessful in their pursuit of several claims against Mexico.

=== Latin America ===
Adams and Clay sought engagement with Latin America in order to prevent it from falling under the British Empire's economic influence. As part of this goal, the administration favored sending a U.S. delegation to the Congress of Panama, an 1826 conference of New World republics organized by Simón Bolívar. Clay and Adams hoped that the conference would inaugurate a "Good Neighborhood Policy" among the independent states of the Americas. However, the funding for a delegation and the confirmation of delegation nominees became entangled in a political battle over Adams's domestic policies, with opponents such as Senator Martin Van Buren impeding the process of confirming a delegation. Van Buren saw the Panama Congress as an unwelcome deviation from the more isolationist foreign policy established by President George Washington, while Calhoun was eager to discredit a Clay initiative. Though the delegation finally won confirmation from the Senate, it never reached the Congress of Panama due to the Senate's delay.

In 1825, Antonio José Cañas, the Federal Republic of Central America's (FCRA) ambassador to the United States, proposed a treaty to provide for the construction of a canal across Nicaragua. Impressed with the new Erie Canal, Adams was intrigued by the possibility of the canal. The FCRA awarded a contract for the construction of the canal to a group of American businessmen, but the enterprise ultimately collapsed due to lack of funding. The failure of the canal contributed to the collapse of the FCRA, which was dissolved in 1839.

=== Border issues ===
As president, Adams continued to pursue an agreement on territorial disputes with Britain, including the unsettled border between Maine and Canada. Gallatin favored partitioning Oregon Country at the Columbia River, but Adams and Clay were unwilling to concede territory below the 49th parallel north. Mexico gained its independence shortly after the United States and Spain ratified the Adams–Onís Treaty, and the Adams administration approached Mexico about a renegotiation of the Mexico–United States border. Joel Roberts Poinsett, the ambassador to Mexico, unsuccessfully attempted to purchase Texas. In 1826, American settlers in Texas launched the Fredonian Rebellion, but Adams prevented the United States from becoming directly involved.

== Presidential election of 1828 ==
1828 presidential election results

The Jacksonians formed an effective party apparatus that adopted many modern campaign techniques. Rather than focusing on issues, they emphasized Jackson's popularity and the supposed corruption of Adams and the federal government. Jackson himself described the campaign as a "struggle between the virtue of the people and executive patronage." Adams, meanwhile, refused to adapt to the new reality of political campaigns, and he avoided public functions and refused to invest in pro-administration tools such as newspapers. In early 1827, Jackson was publicly accused of having encouraged his wife, Rachel, to desert her first husband. In response, followers of Jackson attacked Adams's personal life, and the campaign turned increasingly nasty. The Jacksonian press portrayed Adams as an out-of-touch elitist, while pro-Adams newspapers attacked Jackson's past involvement in various duels and scuffles, portraying him as too emotional and impetuous for the presidency. Though Adams and Clay had hoped that the campaign would focus on the American System, it was instead dominated by personalities of Jackson and Adams.

Vice President Calhoun joined Jackson's ticket, while Adams turned to Secretary of the Treasury Richard Rush as his running mate after Governor John Andrew Shulze of Pennsylvania declined the role. The 1828 election thus marked the first time in U.S. history that a presidential ticket composed of two Northerners faced off against a presidential ticket composed of two Southerners. Neither side publicly campaigned on the issue of slavery, but Adams's status as a New Englander may have hurt him, as many outside of New England held negative cultural stereotypes about the region. Despite his own difficulties in winning Federalist support, Adams's previous affiliation with the Federalist Party early in his public career damaged his candidacy in some areas, especially the West.

The key states in the election were New York, Pennsylvania, and Ohio, which accounted for nearly a third of the country's electoral votes. Jackson won Pennsylvania, Ohio, and even Clay's home state of Kentucky. He also won a majority of the electoral votes in New York, and denied Adams a sweep of New England by winning an electoral vote in Maine. Jackson won 50.3 percent of the popular vote in the free states and 72.6 percent of the vote in the slave states. In total, Jackson won 178 of the 261 electoral votes and just under 56 percent of the popular vote. No future presidential candidate would match Jackson's proportion of the popular vote until Theodore Roosevelt's 1904 campaign, while Adams's loss made him the second one-term president, after his own father. By 1828, only two states did not hold a popular vote for president, and the total number of votes in 1828 election was triple the number of votes in the 1824 election. This increase in votes was due not only to the recent wave of democratization, but also because of increased interest in the election and the growing ability of the parties to mobilize voters.

The election marked the permanent end of the Era of Good Feelings and the start of the Second Party System. The dream of non-partisan politics, shared by Monroe, Adams, and many earlier leaders, was shattered, replaced with Van Buren's ideal of partisan battles between legitimated political parties. Ideologically, Adams had campaigned on the belief that the government should seek to improve the lives of citizens, while Jackson campaigned on the belief that the government should only be concerned with defending liberty against power. Though Jackson decisively won the 1828 election, the Jackson-Adams dichotomy would resonate in future presidential elections. The coalition of Jacksonians, Calhounites, and Crawfordites built by Jackson and Van Buren would become the Democratic Party, which dominated presidential politics in the decades prior to the Civil War. Supporters of Adams and Clay would form the main opposition to Jackson as the National Republican Party. The National Republicans in turn eventually formed part of the Whig Party, which was the second major party in the United States between the 1830s and the early 1850s.

== Departure ==
John Quincy Adams left office on March 4, 1829. Adams did not attend the inauguration of his successor, Andrew Jackson, who had openly snubbed him by refusing to pay the traditional "courtesy call" to the outgoing president during the weeks before his own inauguration. Jackson's wife had died shortly after the election, and Jackson blamed Adams and his followers for her death. Adams was one of only four presidents who chose not to attend their respective successors's inaugurations; the others were his father, Andrew Johnson, and Donald Trump.

== Historical reputation ==
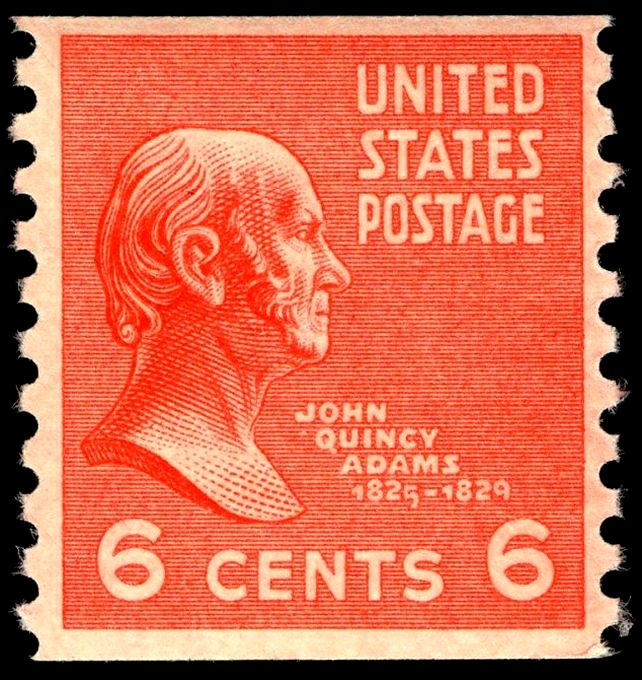
John Quincy Adams appears on the 6-cent U.S. Postage stamp of the 1938 Presidential Series.

John Quincy Adams is generally ranked by historians and political scientists as an average president. He is remembered as a great secretary of state and a man eminently qualified for the presidency, yet hopelessly weakened in his presidential leadership potential as a result of the election of 1824. Most importantly, Adams is remembered as a poor politician in a day and age when politics had begun to matter more. He spoke of trying to serve as a man above the "baneful weed of party strife" at the precise moment in history when America's Second Party System was emerging with nearly revolutionary force.

Paul Nagel argues that Adams's political acumen was not any less developed than others were in his day, and instead argues that Adams' political problems were the result of an unusually hostile Jacksonian faction and Adams' own dislike of the office. Although a product of the political culture of his day, Adams refused to play politics according to the usual rules and was not as aggressive in courting political support as he could have been. The followers of Jackson relentlessly attacked him for his involvement in the supposed bargain with Clay in the election.

John Quincy Adams

A 2017 C-SPAN survey has Adams ranked among the middle third of presidents of all time, right below George H. W. Bush and above Ulysses S. Grant. The survey asked 91 presidential historians to rank the 43 former presidents (including the outgoing president, Barack Obama) in various categories to come up with a composite score, resulting in an overall ranking. Adams was ranked 21st among all former presidents (down from 19th in both the 2009 and 2000 surveys). His rankings in the various categories of this most recent poll were as follows: public persuasion (33), crisis leadership (23), economic management (17), moral authority (16), international relations (15), administrative skills (18), relations with congress (32), vision/setting an agenda (15), pursued equal justice for all (9), performance with context of times (22). A 2018 poll of the American Political Science Association’s Presidents and Executive Politics section ranked Adams as the 23rd best president.

== Bibliography ==
- "John Quincy Adams." in Dictionary of American Biography (1936) Online
- Abraham, Henry Julian (2008). Justices, Presidents, and Senators: A History of the U.S. Supreme Court Appointments from Washington to Bush II. Rowman & Littlefield. ISBN 9780742558953.
- Bradburn, Douglas. "The Presidency of John Adams." in A Companion to John Adams and John Quincy Adams (2013) pp: 166–183.
- Cooper, William J. The lost founding father: John Quincy Adams and the transformation of American politics (Liveright Publishing, 2017).
- Edel, Charles N. (2014). Nation Builder: John Quincy Adams and the Grand Strategy of the Republic. Harvard Univ. Press.
- Graff, Henry F., ed. The Presidents: A Reference History (3rd ed. 2002) online
- Hargreaves, Mary W.M. (1985). The Presidency of John Quincy Adams. Univ. Press of Kansas. ISBN 9780700602728.
- Howe, Daniel Walker (2007). What Hath God Wrought: The Transformation of America, 1815–1848. Oxford History of the United States. Oxford University Press. ISBN 978-0-19-507894-7. OCLC 122701433.
- Kaplan, Fred (2014). John Quincy Adams: American Visionary. HarperCollins. Biography
- Nagel, Paul (1999). John Quincy Adams: A Public Life, a Private Life. Cambridge, MA: Harvard Univ. Press. ISBN 978-0674479401. online book review
- Neiswander, Judith (2024). Mother Brook and the Mills of East Dedham. Damianos Publishing. ISBN 978-1-941573-66-2.
- O'Connor, Peter. "John Quincy Adams: An Exceptionally Average President?" in Perspectives on Presidential Leadership (Routledge, 2014) pp. 43–60 online.
- Parsons, Lynn H. (2009). The Birth of Modern Politics: Andrew Jackson, John Quincy Adams, and the Election of 1828. Oxford Univ. Press. ISBN 978-0-19-531287-4. excerpt and text search
- Parsons, Lynn H. (1998). John Quincy Adams. Rowman and LittleField.
- Parsons, Lynn Hudson, ed. John Quincy Adams: A Bibliography (Greenwood, 1993).
- Remini, Robert V. (2002). John Quincy Adams. New York: Times Books. ISBN 0-8050-6939-9.
- Taub, James. John Quincy Adams: Militant Spirit (2016) online book review
- Unger, Harlow Giles. John Quincy Adams (Da Capo Press, 2012), biography.
- Waldstreicher, David, ed. A Companion to John Adams and John Quincy Adams (John Wiley & Sons, 2013). emphasis on historiography.
