= Verloop =

Verloop is a surname. Notable people with the surname include:

- Marja Verloop (fl. from 1998), Dutch-born American career diplomat
- Willemijn Verloop (born 1970), Dutch philanthropist
