= Christopher Hughes (diplomat) =

American attorney and diplomat

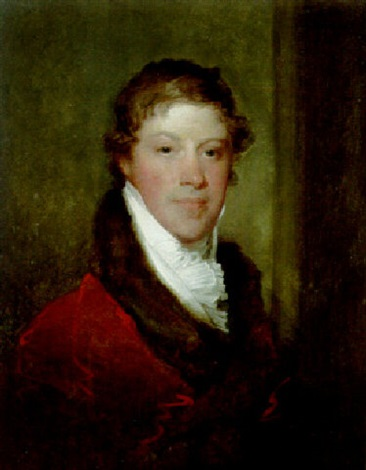
- Portrait by Gilbert Stuart, 1816

U.S. Minister to the Netherlands
- In office 1842–1845
- Preceded by: Harmanus Bleecker
- Succeeded by: Auguste Davezac

U.S. Minister to Sweden
- In office 1830–1842
- Preceded by: John James Appleton
- Succeeded by: George W. Lay

U.S. Minister to the Netherlands
- In office 1826–1830
- Preceded by: Alexander H. Everett
- Succeeded by: William Pitt Preble

U.S. Minister to Sweden
- In office 1817–1825
- Preceded by: Jonathan Russell
- Succeeded by: William C. Somerville

Personal details
- Born: February 11, 1786 Baltimore, Maryland, U.S.
- Died: September 18, 1849 (aged 63) Baltimore, Maryland, U.S.
- Resting place: Green Mount Cemetery, Baltimore, Maryland
- Party: Democratic–Republican; Democratic
- Spouse: Laura Smith (m. 1811–1832)
- Relations: Samuel Smith (father-in-law); George Armistead (brother-in-law); Anthony Kennedy (son-in-law)
- Children: Charles (d. 1839); Margaret (1819–1884)
- Parent(s): Christopher Hughes, Sr. (1745-1824); Margaret Sanderson Hughes (1760–1825)
- Education: College of New Jersey (now Princeton University)
- Profession: Attorney; Diplomat

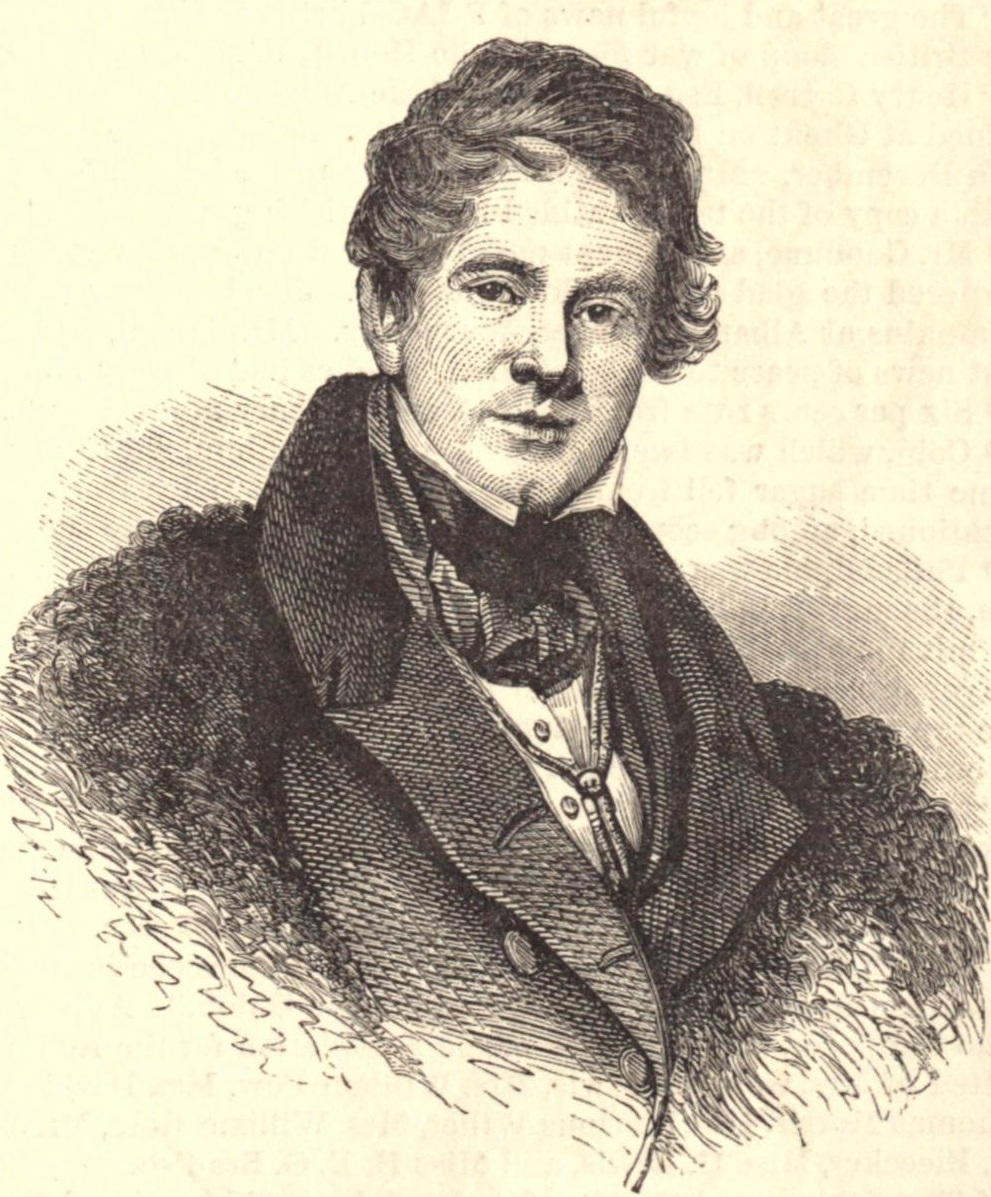
Christopher Hughes, depicted in 1868's The Pictorial Field-Book of the War of 1812

Christopher Hughes (February 11, 1786 – September 18, 1849) was an American attorney and diplomat who served as Chargé d'affaires in Sweden and The Netherlands in the 1820s and 1830s. He was the son in law of United States Senator Samuel Smith.

== Early life ==
Christopher Hughes, the son of Christopher Hughes, Sr. and Margaret Sanderson Hughes was born in Baltimore, Maryland on February 11, 1786. He was one of fourteen children, of whom six lived to adulthood. He had a twin sister, Margaret (Peggy), who married Colonel Samuel Moore, and was the only sibling with whom he remained close. Another sister, Louisa, was the wife of George Armistead.

Hughes graduated from the College of New Jersey (now Princeton University) in 1805, studied law, and was admitted to the bar in Baltimore. In 1811 he married Laura Smith, the daughter of Senator Samuel Smith.

== War of 1812 ==
During the War of 1812 Hughes served as a captain of Artillery stationed at Fort McHenry. In 1813 Hughes was the Secretary for the American delegation which negotiated the Treaty of Ghent that ended the war, an appointment which resulted in lifelong friendships with delegation members John Quincy Adams and Henry Clay. At the conclusion of the negotiations Hughes was one of two secretaries dispatched to the United States to deliver copies of the treaty, and his meetings with President James Madison and Secretary of State James Monroe to report on the negotiations gave him the opportunity to establish relationships which enabled him to pursue a diplomatic career.

== Political and diplomatic career ==
In 1815 Hughes was elected to the Maryland House of Delegates as a Democratic-Republican, and he served one term. In 1816 he declined an opportunity to run for the United States House of Representatives, deferring to his father in law, who was elected.

Later in 1816 Monroe dispatched Hughes to New Granada (now Colombia) to negotiate with Spanish authorities, who had confiscated several American ships and their cargo and imprisoned the crews. The authorities in New Granada had sold off the ships and cargo by the time Hughes arrived, but he was able to secure the release of most of the 50 crew members, excepting those who had died, escaped or already been freed.

Monroe then appointed Hughes as Chargé d'affaires in Stockholm, where he served until 1825. During his time in Sweden, Hughes worked to implement and expand on trade agreements negotiated by his predecessor, Jonathan Russell. In Stockholm he rented rooms from Baroness Emerentia Augusta Charlotta von Lantingshausen Rålamb and her husband Claes Gustaf Rålamb in the Lantinghausen Palace opposite Stockholm Palace.

After John Quincy Adams became president, he honored Hughes's request for a new diplomatic posting, nominating him to serve as chargé d'affaires in The Netherlands. In 1830 the United States decided to upgrade the post in The Netherlands to Minister Plenipotentiary, but disappointed Hughes by nominating William Pitt Preble of Maine. At the time the King of The Netherlands had agreed to mediate the Maine-New Brunswick boundary dispute between the United States and Great Britain, and the Senate determined that U.S. interests would be better served by someone with first hand knowledge of the issue.

After Preble's appointment was confirmed Hughes was nominated to return to Sweden as Chargé d'affaires. He served until 1842 and continued his work to enhance trade between Sweden and the United States. Hughes's wife died in 1832, and his father in law and son Charles in 1839. He also had a daughter, Margaret (January 9, 1819—August 1, 1884), who had settled in Baltimore after her mother's death. Margaret was the second wife of Senator Anthony Kennedy.

As a result of these personal events Hughes began to ask for a new assignment that would enable him to change his location, and in 1842 President John Tyler appointed Hughes to a second tour as Chargé d'affaires in The Netherlands. He served until 1845, when the incoming administration of President James K. Polk and Secretary of State James Buchanan appointed Auguste Davezac to take his place.

== Retirement, death and burial ==
Hughes returned to Baltimore, where he lived in retirement until his death on September 18, 1849. He is buried in Baltimore's Green Mount Cemetery.

Diplomatic posts
Preceded by Jonathan Russell	U.S. Minister to Sweden; 1817–1825	Succeeded by William C. Somerville
Preceded by Alexander H. Everett	U.S. Minister to the Netherlands; 1826–1830	Succeeded by William Pitt Preble
Preceded by John James Appleton	U.S. Minister to Sweden; 1830–1842	Succeeded by George W. Lay
Preceded by Harmanus Bleecker	U.S. Minister to the Netherlands; 1842–1845	Succeeded by Auguste Davezac
