= Samuel R. Thayer =

American attorney and diplomat

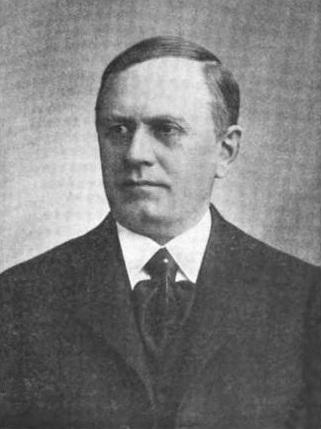

United States Ambassador to the Netherlands
- In office May 24, 1889 – August 7, 1893
- President: Benjamin Harrison
- Preceded by: Robert B. Roosevelt
- Succeeded by: William E. Quinby

Personal details
- Born: Samuel Richard Thayer; December 12, 1837 Richmond, New York, U.S.
- Died: January 7, 1909 (aged 71) Rochester, New York, U.S.
- Resting place: Mount Hope Cemetery
- Party: Republican
- Education: Union College

Samuel Richard Thayer (December 12, 1837 – January 7, 1909) was an American attorney and diplomat who served as United States Ambassador to the Netherlands.

== Early life ==
Thayer was born in Richmond, New York, on December 12, 1837. He was the son of George Thayer (1807–1900), a constable, farmer and store owner, and Phebe Lorenda (née Wood) Thayer (1813–1873).

He graduated from Union College in Schenectady, New York, in 1860 and taught school for two years. He then relocated to Minneapolis, Minnesota, studied law with Francis R. E. Cornell, attained admission to the bar, and established a practice in Minneapolis.

== Career ==
A Republican, Thayer was interested in higher education and served as a member of the Minnesota State Normal School Board from 1873 to 1877.

On March 19, 1889 President Benjamin Harrison appointed Thayer to succeed Robert Barnwell Roosevelt as Ambassador to the Netherlands. Thayer served until 1893 when he was succeeded by William Emory Quinby.

Besides maintaining a thriving law practice, Thayer was a successful businessman, including profitable investments in Minnesota real estate, and he made substantial donations to normal schools and colleges throughout the state. In 1892, he received an honorary LL.D. degree from Union College. Later in his career he maintained homes and offices in both Minneapolis and New York City.

== Personal life ==
Thayer died in Rochester, New York, on January 7, 1909, while visiting his brother. He was buried at Mount Hope Cemetery in Rochester.

Diplomatic posts
Preceded by Robert Roosevelt	U.S. Minister to the Netherlands; 1889–1893	Succeeded by William E. Quinby
