= William Pitt Preble =

American judge

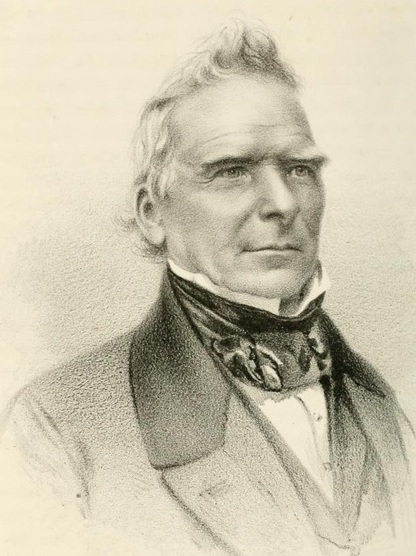

William Pitt Preble (November 27, 1783 – October 11, 1857) was an American lawyer, judge, diplomat and businessman. He was one of the first Justices of the Maine Supreme Court and U.S. Minister to the Netherlands.

== Biography ==
William Pitt Preble was born in York, Maine (the District of Maine was then a part of Massachusetts) on November 27, 1783. He graduated from Harvard University in 1806, received a master's degree from Harvard in 1809, studied law, and began a practice in York. In 1811 he was appointed County Attorney for York County. First a Democratic-Republican, and later a Democrat, in 1814 Preble was named United States Attorney for Maine, and he served until 1820. In 1819 he was a Delegate to the Maine Constitutional Convention which resulted in Maine statehood.

In 1820 Preble was named one of the first Justices of the Maine Supreme Court, holding office until 1828. In 1829 President Andrew Jackson appointed Preble as Minister to the Netherlands. This appointment came about because the King of the Netherlands had agreed to mediate between the United States and Great Britain to resolve the question of the border between Maine and New Brunswick, and Preble's work as a U.S. Attorney and Judge made him knowledgeable on the subject. He served from 1830 to 1831, afterwards returning to the United States to accept appointment as one of the federal commissioners appointed to work with commissioners from Great Britain to resolve other outstanding issues related to the settling of the border question. The entire matter was finally resolved in 1842 by passage of the Webster-Ashburton Treaty.

In the 1840s Preble became interested in railroads, with his primary interest being the construction of a line through the United States and Canada that would connect Portland to the St. Lawrence River, the Great Lakes Region and the Mississippi River as a way to enhance Portland's trade and commerce. When the St. Lawrence and Atlantic Railroad was incorporated in 1845 Preble was named its President, and he negotiated with governments in England, Canada and the United States to obtain rights of way and other concessions needed to accomplish construction and begin operations.

From 1820 to 1842 Preble was a Trustee of Bowdoin College, and Bowdoin awarded him an honorary LL.D. degree in 1829.

Preble died in Portland on October 11, 1857. He was buried at Evergreen Cemetery in Portland.

His granddaughter Marian Longfellow O'Donoghue was a founder of the National League of American Pen Women in 1897.

Diplomatic posts
Preceded by Christopher Hughes	U.S. Minister to the Netherlands; 1830–1831	Succeeded by Auguste Davezac
