= William E. Quinby =

American newspaper publisher and diplomat

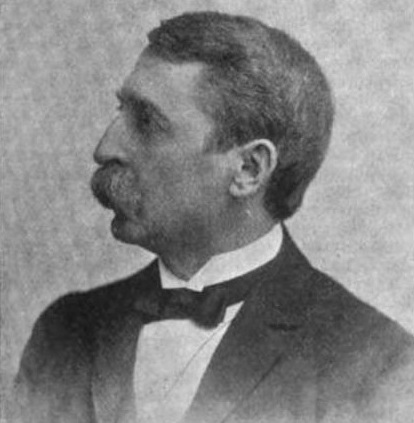

United States Ambassador to the Netherlands
- In office 1893–1897
- President: Grover Cleveland
- Preceded by: Samuel R. Thayer
- Succeeded by: Stanford Newel

Personal details
- Born: William Emory Quinby; December 14, 1835 Brewer, Maine, U.S.
- Died: June 7, 1908 (aged 72) Detroit, Michigan, U.S.
- Party: Democrat
- Education: University of Michigan

William Emory Quinby (December 14, 1835 – June 7, 1908) was an American newspaper publisher and diplomat who served as United States Ambassador to the Netherlands.

== Early life ==
Quinby was born in Brewer, Maine, on December 14, 1835. His family moved to Detroit in 1850, where his father Daniel F. Quinby published a magazine, The Literary Miscellany. William Quinby attended Gregory's Business College in Detroit before transferring to the University of Michigan, where he received a Bachelor of Arts degree in 1858. He then studied law, attained admission to the bar and practiced in Detroit for two years. In 1861 he received a Master of Arts degree from the University of Michigan.

== Career ==
Deciding to abandon law for journalism, in 1861 Quinby became a reporter for the Detroit Free Press. By 1872 he had purchased the majority of stock in the paper and advanced to editor-in-chief.

Active in politics as a Democrat, in 1893 President Grover Cleveland nominated him as Ambassador to the Netherlands, where he served until 1897.

In 1896 the University of Michigan awarded him the honorary degree of LL.D. In 1900, Quinby wrote a letter for the Detroit Century Box time capsule.

== Personal life ==
He retired in 1906 and died in Detroit on June 7, 1908.

Diplomatic posts
Preceded by Samuel R. Thayer	U.S. Minister to the Netherlands; 1893–1897	Succeeded by Stanford Newel
