= John James Appleton =

American diplomat

United States Chargé d'Affaires to Sweden
- In office October 28, 1826 – August 16, 1830
- President: John Quincy Adams; Andrew Jackson
- Preceded by: Christopher Hughes Jr.
- Succeeded by: Christopher Hughes Jr.

United States Chargé d'Affaires to Portugal
- Ad interim
- In office June 1820 – July 12, 1821
- President: James Monroe
- Preceded by: John Graham
- Succeeded by: Henry Dearborn

Personal details
- Born: 1792 Calais, France
- Died: May 4, 1864 Rennes, France
- Education: Harvard College
- Occupation: diplomat

John James Appleton (September 22, 1792 – March 4, 1864) was an American diplomat who served the United States in several European countries.

== Biography ==
Appleton was born in Calais, France on September 22, 1792 while his father John Appleton (1758-1829) was the U.S. Consul there.

John James Appleton studied at Phillips Andover Academy, and graduated from Harvard College in 1813.

Appleton was appointed secretary of the legation in the Netherlands, and served from 1817 to 1819. He was then secretary of the legation at Rio de Janeiro, Brazil. He was nominated to serve as chargé d'affaires there, and held the position on an interim basis from 1820 to 1821, but the nomination not confirmed by the United States Senate.

From 1822 to 1824 Appleton was chargé d'affaires in Madrid, Spain. He then served as chargé d'affaires in Stockholm, Sweden from 1826 to 1830. In Sweden he negotiated the commercial treaty that still serves as the basis of intercourse between the United States and Sweden.

In 1825 Appleton was appointed as U.S. special representative to the Kingdom of Naples, where he attempted to settle American claims arising from the seizure and sale of ships and cargo during the government of Joachim Murat.

Appleton was married to Marie Augustine Houdan (d. May 6, 1861), a native of France. Their children included Marie Augustine, John Osgood and Charles Louis. His daughter Marie married Eugene Pinault, who served as deputy mayor of Rennes, France. Appleton spent the greater part of his post-diplomatic career in France, making only occasional visits to America.

John James Appleton died in Rennes on March 4, 1864.

== See also ==
- United States Ambassador to Sweden
- United States Ambassador to Portugal
