= List of ambassadors of the United States to the Netherlands =

Ambassador of the United States to the Netherlands
- Ambassadeur van de Verenigde Staten in Nederland
- Seal of the United States Department of State

- Flag of a United States ambassador

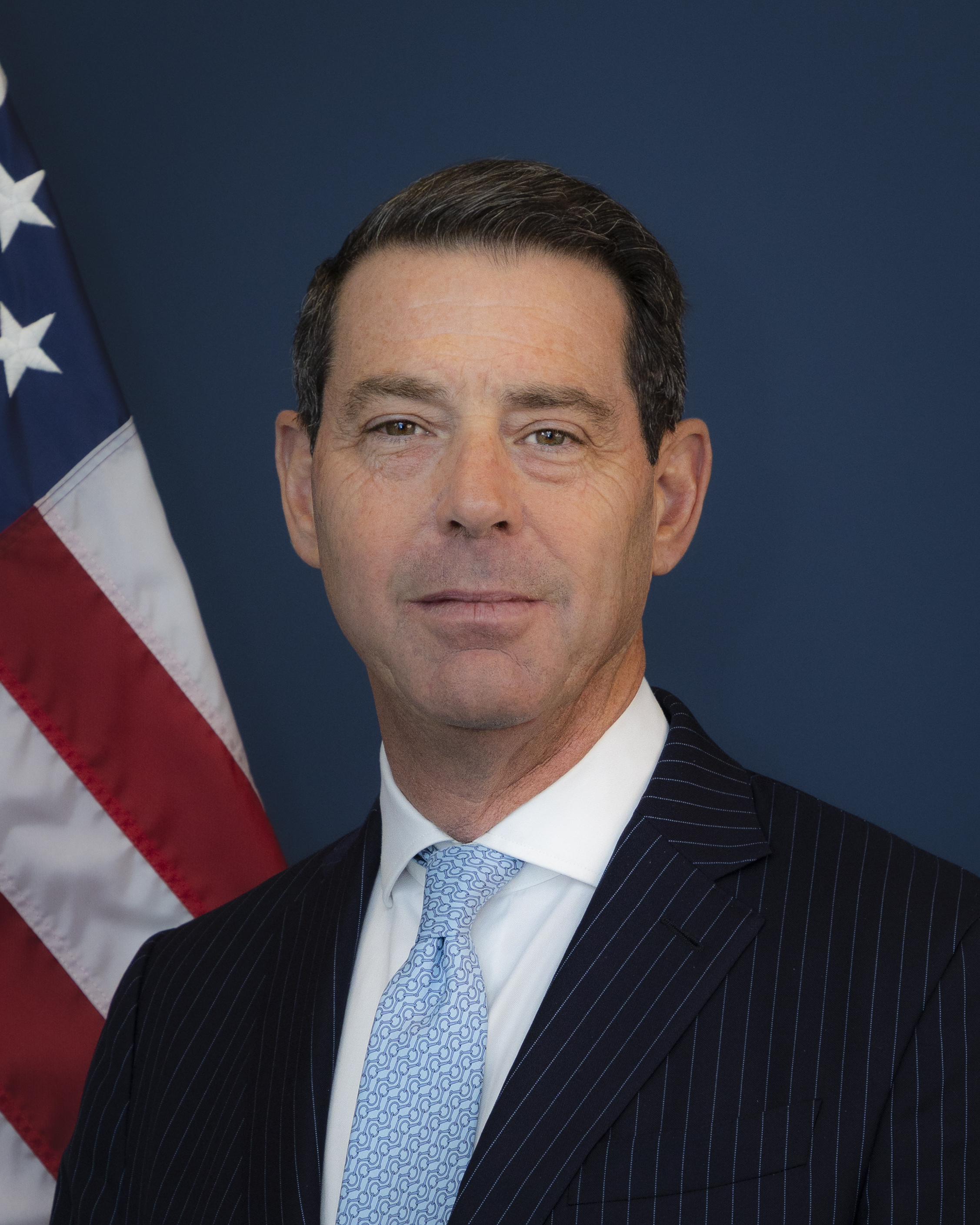
- Incumbent; Joseph Popolo Jr. since October 29, 2025
- Seat: Embassy of the United States, The Hague
- Nominator: The president of the United States
- Inaugural holder: John Adams as Minister Plenipotentiary
- Formation: April 19, 1782
- Website: nl.usembassy.gov

The United States diplomatic mission to the Netherlands consists of the embassy located in The Hague and a consular office located in Amsterdam.

In 1782, John Adams was appointed America's first Minister Plenipotentiary to Holland. According to the United States Department of State, the same year came formal recognition by the Netherlands of the United States as a separate and independent nation, along with badly needed financial help that indicated faith in its future. These loans from the United Provinces, which have been called "the Marshall Plan in reverse," were the first the new government received. Adams purchased a home in the Hague at Fluwelen Burgwal 18 (located within Uilebomen, The Hague Center), as the first U.S. embassy.

The current American Embassy building in The Hague opened on January 29, 2018. Notable Americans such as former Presidents Adams and John Quincy Adams, General Hugh Ewing and Iraq Envoy L. Paul Bremer have held the title of Ambassador.

Besides the embassy, a U.S. consulate-general is located on Curaçao which is responsible for the territory of the Kingdom of the Netherlands in the Caribbean. This consulate is not part of the U.S. diplomatic mission to the Netherlands.

April 19, the day John Adams presented his credentials in the Hague, was declared by President Ronald Reagan to be memorialized as "Dutch-American Friendship Day".

== Ambassadors ==
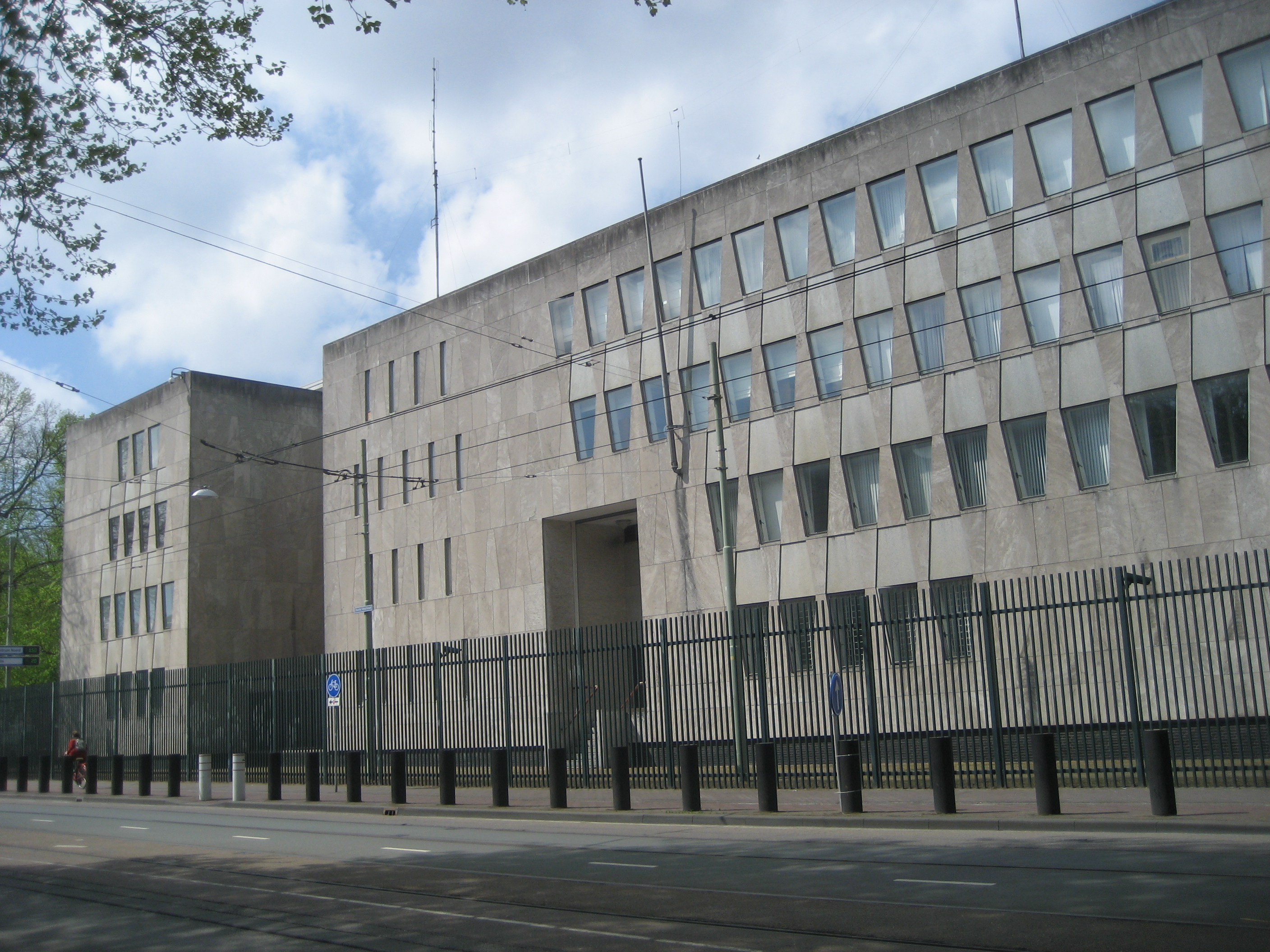
The former building of the Embassy of the United States, The Hague

#	Name	Type	Start date	End date
1	John Adams	MP	April 19, 1782	March 30, 1788
2	William Livingston	MP		
3	John Rutledge	MP		
4	William Short	MP	June 18, 1792	December 19, 1792
5	John Quincy Adams	MP	November 6, 1794	June 20, 1797
6	William Vans Murray	MP	June 20, 1797	September 2, 1801
7	William Eustis	EE/MP	July 20, 1815	May 5, 1818
8	Alexander H. Everett	Chd'Aff	January 4, 1819	April 7, 1824
9	Christopher Hughes	Chd'Aff	July 10, 1826	January 28, 1830
10	William Pitt Preble	EE/MP	January 28, 1830	May 2, 1831
11	Auguste Davezac	Chd'Aff	December 30, 1831	July 13, 1839
12	Harmanus Bleecker	Chd'Aff	July 13, 1839	August 22, 1842
13	Christopher Hughes	Chd'Aff	August 22, 1842	June 28, 1845
14	Auguste Davezac	Chd'Aff	June 28, 1845	September 16, 1850
15	George Folsom	Chd'Aff	September 16, 1850	October 11, 1853
16	August Belmont	Chd'Aff	October 11, 1853	September 26, 1854
16	August Belmont	MR	September 26, 1854	September 22, 1857
17	Henry C. Murphy	MR	September 24, 1857	June 8, 1861
18	James S. Pike	MR	June 8, 1861	May 29, 1866
19	Daniel E. Sickles	MR		
20	John A. Dix	MR		
21	Albert Rhodes	Chd'Aff	October 19, 1866	December 1, 1866
22	Hugh Ewing	MR	December 1, 1866	October 31, 1870
23	Joseph P. Root	MR		
24	Charles T. Gorham	MR	December 15, 1870	July 9, 1875
25	Francis B. Stockbridge	MR		
26	James Birney	MR	March 29, 1876	April 20, 1882
27	William L. Dayton, Jr.	MR	September 26, 1882	June 8, 1885
28	Isaac Bell, Jr.	MR	June 8, 1885	April 29, 1888
29	Robert B. Roosevelt	MR	August 10, 1888	September 26, 1888
29	Robert B. Roosevelt	EE/MP	September 26, 1888	May 17, 1889
30	Samuel R. Thayer	EE/MP	May 24, 1889	August 7, 1893
31	William E. Quinby	EE/MP	August 11, 1893	July 26, 1897
32	Stanford Newel	EE/MP	August 19, 1897	June 30, 1905
33	David J. Hill	EE/MP	July 15, 1905	June 1, 1908
34	Arthur M. Beaupre	EE/MP	June 15, 1908	September 25, 1911
35	Lloyd Bryce	EE/MP	November 16, 1911	September 10, 1913
36	Henry van Dyke	EE/MP	October 15, 1913	January 11, 1917
37	John W. Garrett	EE/MP	October 11, 1917	June 18, 1919
38	William Phillips	EE/MP	April 23, 1920	April 11, 1922
39	Richard M. Tobin	EE/MP	May 1, 1923	August 29, 1929
40	Gerrit John Diekema	EE/MP	November 20, 1929	December 20, 1930
41	Laurits S. Swenson	EE/MP	April 29, 1931	March 5, 1934
42	Grenville T. Emmet	EE/MP	March 21, 1934	August 21, 1937
43	George A. Gordon	EE/MP	September 10, 1937	July 16, 1940
44	Anthony J. Drexel Biddle, Jr.	EE/MP	March 27, 1941	May 8, 1942
44	Anthony J. Drexel Biddle, Jr.	AE/P	May 8, 1942	December 1, 1943
45	Stanley K. Hornbeck	AE/P	December 8, 1944	March 7, 1947
46	Herman B. Baruch	AE/P	April 12, 1947	August 26, 1949
47	Selden Chapin	AE/P	October 27, 1949	October 30, 1953
48	H. Freeman Matthews	AE/P	November 25, 1953	June 11, 1957
49	Philip Young	AE/P	June 27, 1957	December 20, 1960
50	John S. Rice	AE/P	May 6, 1961	May 27, 1964
51	William R. Tyler	AE/P	June 23, 1965	June 20, 1969
52	J. William Middendorf II	AE/P	July 9, 1969	June 10, 1973
53	Kingdon Gould, Jr.	AE/P	October 18, 1973	September 30, 1976
54	Robert J. McCloskey	AE/P	October 22, 1976	March 10, 1978
55	Geri M. Joseph	AE/P	September 6, 1978	June 17, 1981
56	William J. Dyess	AE/P	September 2, 1982	July 19, 1983
57	L. Paul Bremer	AE/P	August 31, 1983	August 25, 1986
58	John Shad	AE/P	June 24, 1987	February 23, 1989
59	C. Howard Wilkins, Jr.	AE/P	July 13, 1989	July 11, 1992
60	K. Terry Dornbush	AE/P	March 16, 1994	July 28, 1998
61	Cynthia P. Schneider	AE/P	September 2, 1998	June 17, 2001
62	Clifford Sobel	AE/P	December 6, 2001	August 24, 2005
63	Roland Arnall	AE/P	Mar 8, 2006	March 7, 2008
64	James Culbertson	AE/P	July 10, 2008	January 20, 2009
65	Fay Hartog-Levin	AE/P	August 19, 2009	September 1, 2011
66	Timothy M. Broas	AE/P	March 19, 2014	February 12, 2016
67	Adam H. Sterling	Chd'Aff	February 12, 2016	July 29, 2016
68	Shawn P. Crowley	Chd'Aff	July 29, 2016	January 10, 2018
69	Pete Hoekstra	AE/P	January 10, 2018	January 17, 2021
70	Marja Verloop	Chd'Aff	January 17, 2021	July 4, 2022
71	Aleisha Woodward	Chd'Aff	July 4, 2022	October 18, 2022
72	Shefali Razdan Duggal	AE/P	October 19, 2022	January 20, 2025
72	Marcus Micheli	Chd'Aff	January 20, 2025	October 29, 2025
73	Joseph Popolo, Jr.	AE/P	October 29, 2025	Present

== See also ==
- List of ambassadors of the Netherlands to the United States
- Ambassadors of the United States
- Foreign relations of the Netherlands
- Netherlands–United States relations
