= Harmanus Bleecker =

American politician (1779–1849)

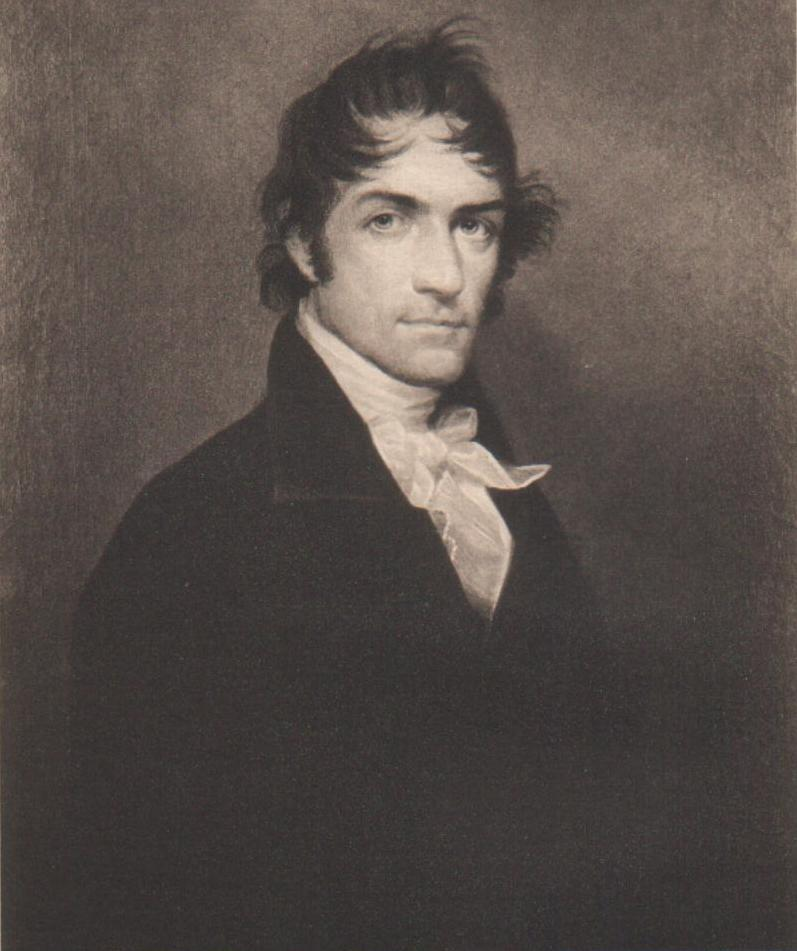

U.S. Minister to the Netherlands
- In office 1837–1842
- Preceded by: Auguste Davezac
- Succeeded by: Christopher Hughes

Member of the New York State Assembly from Albany County
- In office 1815–1816 Serving with Sylvester Ford, Jesse Tyler, John D. Winne
- Preceded by: Johan Jost Dietz, Moses Smith, John L. Winne
- Succeeded by: Michael Freligh, John I. Ostrander, John Schoolcraft, Jesse Smith

Member of the New York State Assembly from Albany County
- In office 1814–1815 Serving with Johan Jost Dietz, Moses Smith, John L. Winne
- Preceded by: David Bogardus, John Gibbons, Elishama Janes, Abraham Van Vechten
- Succeeded by: Sylvester Ford, Jesse Tyler, John D. Winne

Member of the U.S. House of Representatives from New York's 7th district
- In office March 4, 1811 – March 3, 1813
- Preceded by: Killian K. Van Rensselaer
- Succeeded by: Abraham J. Hasbrouck

Personal details
- Born: October 9, 1779 Albany, New York
- Died: July 19, 1849 (aged 69) Albany, New York
- Citizenship: United States
- Party: Federalist
- Other political affiliations: Free Soil (1848)
- Spouse: Sebastiana Cornelia Mentz Bleecker (m. 1842-1849, his death)
- Profession: Attorney, teacher, ambassador

Harmanus Bleecker (October 9, 1779 – July 19, 1849) was an attorney in Albany, New York. A Federalist, he is most notable for his service as a member of the New York State Assembly, a United States representative from New York, and chargé d'Affaires to the Netherlands.

Born in Albany in 1779, Bleecker belonged to an old Dutch family that had lived in Albany since the 1600s. He was educated in Albany, and learned to speak the Dutch language. After studying in the private law office of two established attorneys, Bleecker attained admission to the bar in 1801, and began a practice in Albany. He became a highly regarded lawyer and teacher, and many men who went on to prominent legal and business careers learned the law under his tutelage. He was also active in numerous business ventures, including banks and canal construction and operation.

In 1810, Bleecker won a seat in the U.S. House. He served in the 12th United States Congress (March 4, 1811 to March 3, 1813). Bleecker did not run for reelection in 1812, and resumed practicing law. In 1814 and 1815 he served in the New York State Assembly, where he worked with Governor Daniel D. Tompkins to provide funding for New York troops taking part in the War of 1812.

In 1837, Bleecker took office as Chargé d'Affaires to the Netherlands, appointed by longtime friend Martin Van Buren, who shared Bleecker's interest in the Dutch language and culture. He served until 1842, after which he resumed practicing law in Albany. Bleecker took part in numerous philanthropic and civic endeavors, including the establishment of several Albany-area hospitals and oversight of several universities. He died in Albany in 1849, and was buried at Albany Rural Cemetery.

Bleecker married late in life, and had no children. After her death in 1885, his widow honored his request to leave his fortune for the benefit of the citizens of Albany. The money was used to construct Bleecker Hall, a library and theater. The association responsible for the institution later sold Bleecker Hall, and then constructed Harmanus Bleecker Library, a building that was used solely as a library. Bleecker Library was later redeveloped as private offices, and is now listed on the National Register of Historic Places

== Early life ==
Harmanus Bleecker was born into an old Dutch family in Albany, New York on October 9, 1779. His father Jacob Bleecker was a prominent merchant, and his mother Elizabeth Wendell was the daughter of Hermanus Wendell, an Albany furrier. Harmanus Bleecker was also the great-great grandson of Jan Jansen Bleecker, the first Bleecker family member to reside in North America. As a young man, Harmanus Bleecker studied law with John Vernon Henry and James Emott, was admitted to the bar in 1801, and commenced practice in Albany. During a large portion of his career, Bleecker practiced at the firm of Bleecker & Sedgwick with Theodore Sedgwick (1780–1839) as his partner.

Bleecker was also a highly regarded teacher, and among the students who learned the law in his office were: David Dudley Field (1805–1894); Stephen Johnson Field; Charlemagne Tower; Bradford R. Wood; Peter Gansevoort; Solomon Southwick; Timothy Childs, and Charles Fenno Hoffman.

== Political, legal and business career ==
He was elected as a Federalist to the 12th United States Congress, holding office from March 4, 1811 to March 3, 1813. He was not a candidate for renomination in 1812 and resumed the practice of law in Albany.

Bleecker also pursued several business ventures, including serving on the board of directors of Albany's Mechanics and Farmers Bank. In addition, he was a Trustee of the Erie and Champlain Canals.

Bleecker was a member of the New York State Assembly in 1814 and 1815. Though Bleecker had been an opponent of the War of 1812 while in Congress, during the war he worked with Governor Daniel D. Tompkins to finance the equipping, supplying and pay of the state militia after it was federalized.

In the late 1820s Bleecker was one of New York's Commissioners who worked with Commissioners from New Jersey to determine the boundary between the two states. In 1839 Bleecker was a member of the original Board of Governors that founded Albany City Hospital, now Albany Medical Center.

In 1843 Bleecker received an honorary LL.D. degree from Union College, and he was an honorary member of the Phi Beta Kappa society. From 1822 to 1834 Bleecker was a member of the University of the State of New York Board of Regents.

Bleecker opposed slavery, and was a member of the American Colonization and New-York Colonization Societies. The societies advocated for the gradual emancipation of slaves, and for free African Americans to be relocated to what society members believed was greater freedom in Africa, including the colony of Liberia.

== Diplomatic career ==
He was Chargé d'Affaires to the Netherlands from May 12, 1837 to June 28, 1842, initially appointed by President Martin Van Buren, who was friendly with Bleecker and shared his interest in Dutch culture and language. Bleecker was chosen in preference to John Lloyd Stephens, who also aspired to the position. As a practitioner of the traditional Dutch culture as it had been passed down in Albany and a speaker of the old-style Dutch language, Bleecker was very well received by the government and people of the Netherlands. According to often-repeated accounts, when Bleecker presented his credentials, King William supposedly remarked "You speak better Dutch than we do in Holland!"

== Retirement and death ==
After returning to Albany in 1842, Bleecker retired from most public life and business pursuits. From 1846 until his death he was a member of the Executive Committee that organized and oversaw the State Normal College, now the State University of New York at Albany (SUNYA). He died in Albany on July 19, 1849 and was buried at Albany Rural Cemetery, Section 3, Lot 61.

== Personal relationships ==
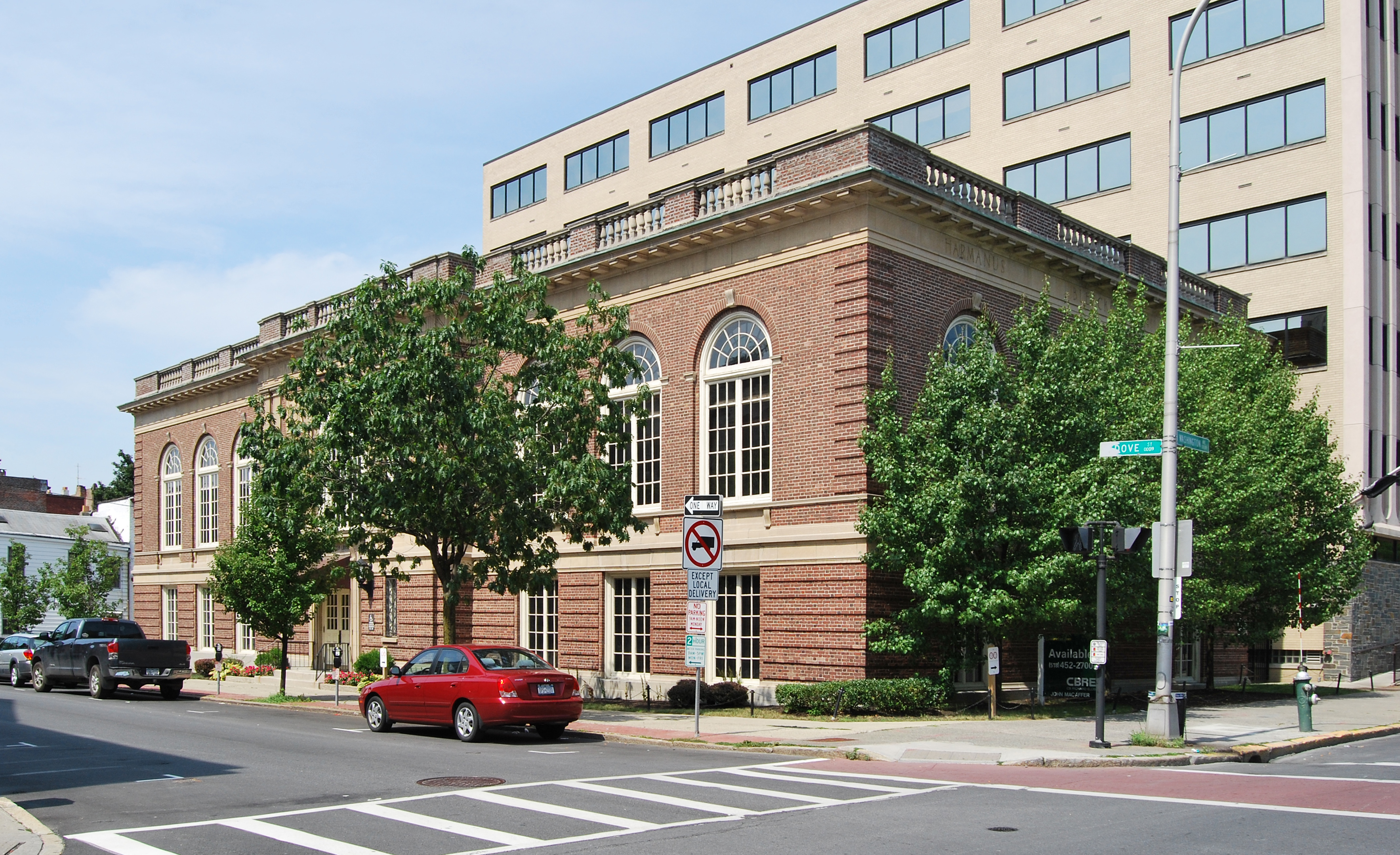
Harmanus Bleecker Library, constructed with bequest from Harmanus Bleecker.

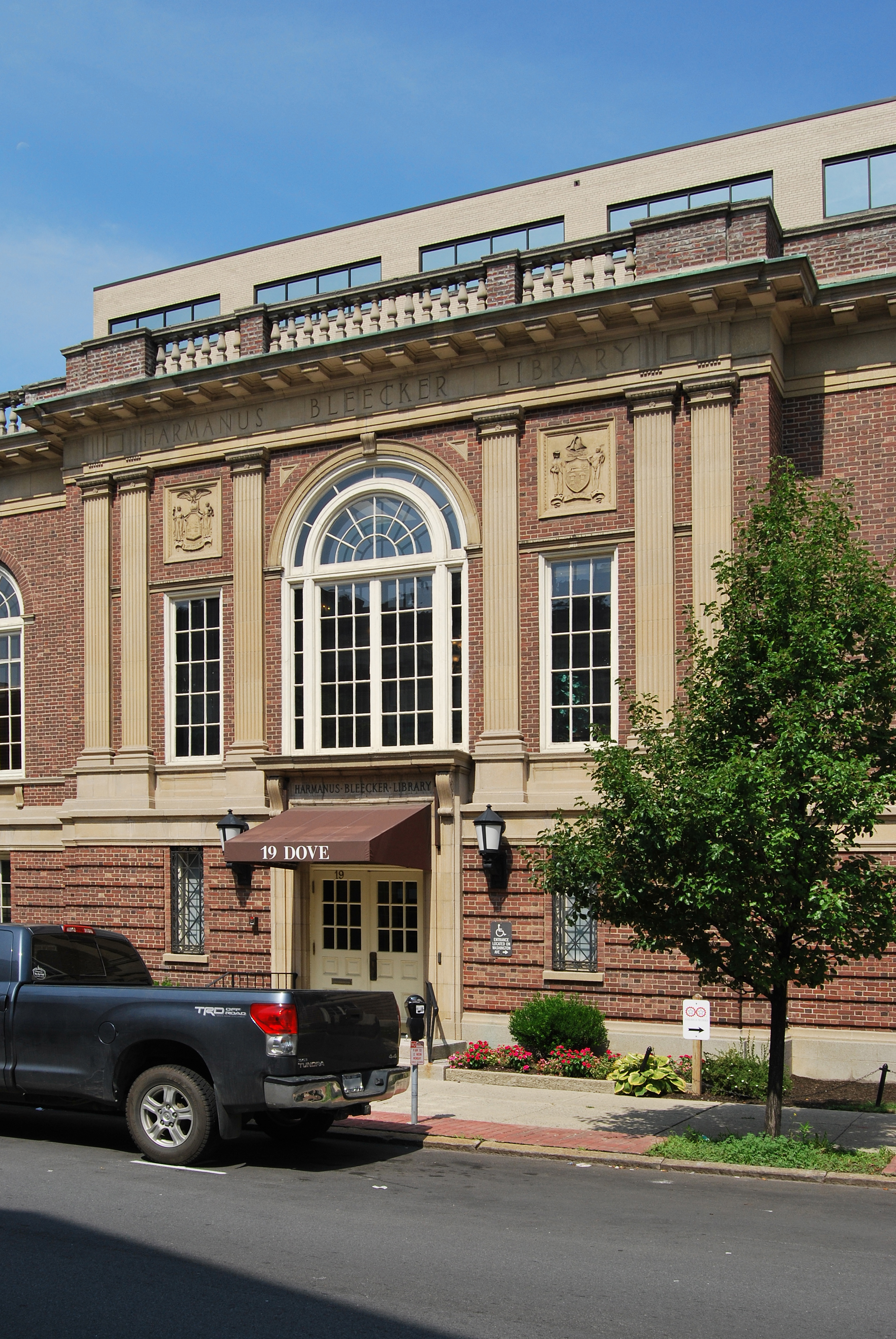
Entrance to Bleecker Library.

Harmanus Bleecker maintained numerous friendships and professional relationships, many of which transcended political leanings. For many years he practiced law with Theodore Sedgwick (1780–1839), the son of Federalist legislator and judge Theodore Sedgwick (1746–1813), and he was once engaged to Judge Sedgwick's daughter Catharine Sedgwick. He was also a close friend of Federalist Congressman and Boston Mayor Josiah Quincy (1772–1864).

In addition, Bleecker was a longtime friend of Martin Van Buren, a Democrat with whom he shared an interest in the Dutch culture and language. By 1848, Bleecker's opposition to slavery and personal affinity for Van Buren had caused him to be identified with the Free Soil Party, and he was a candidate for presidential elector on Van Buren's ticket.

While still a Federalist Bleecker began a close friendship with Democratic Congressman and Senator John Randolph (1773–1833). Bleecker and Randolph exchanged portraits as a token of their mutual esteem, and each displayed in his home the portrait of the other.

== Philanthropy ==
Bleecker married Sebastiana Cornelia Mentz of Arnhem, a woman many years younger than him, whom he met while he was a diplomat in the Netherlands. She lived with him in Albany, and inherited his estate. They had no children, and after Bleecker's death she married Hendrick Coster and returned to the Netherlands, where she died in 1885. The executors of the Harmanus Bleecker estate, which she left to benefit the City of Albany as Bleecker had requested, decided to spend the $130,000 ($4.4 million in 2023) to construct and maintain Harmanus Bleecker Hall, a library and theater. Originally located near the corner of Washington Avenue and Lark Street, the 1889 Bleecker Hall was used until 1919, when the Young Men's Association, which was responsible for the site, decided to create a structure for use as a library only. They sold the 1889 Bleecker Hall and used the proceeds to construct Harmanus Bleecker Library near the intersection of Washington and Dove Streets, which opened in 1924. Bleecker Hall burned in a 1940 fire and was later demolished.

In 1977, the Albany Public Library's Washington Avenue Branch moved from Bleecker Library into a Washington Avenue building on the site of the old Bleecker Hall. The Bleecker Library building remained vacant for several years until it was purchased by real estate developers. In more recent times the building has been renovated as private office space, and it is listed on the National Register of Historic Places.

== Legacy ==
Bleecker was the subject of a 1924 biography, Harmanus Bleecker: An Albany Dutchman, 1779–1849, by Harriet Langdon Pruyn Rice. Harriet Rice was the daughter of John V. L. Pruyn and granddaughter of Amasa J. Parker. John Pruyn and Amasa Parker had been involved in the disposition of Bleecker's estate, which gave Harriet Rice access to Bleecker's papers.

== Notes ==
Diplomatic posts
Preceded by Auguste Davezac	U.S. Minister to the Netherlands; 1837–1842	Succeeded by Christopher Hughes
U.S. House of Representatives
Preceded by Killian K. Van Rensselaer	Member of the U.S. House of Representatives from New York's 7th congressional district March 4, 1811 – March 3, 1813	Succeeded by Abraham J. Hasbrouck
