= Stanford Newel =

American attorney and diplomat

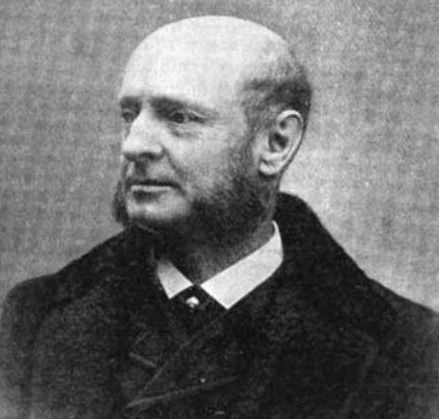

United States Ambassador to Luxembourg
- In office 1903–1905
- President: William McKinley
- Preceded by: Inaugural holder
- Succeeded by: David Jayne Hill

United States Ambassador to the Netherlands
- In office 1897–1905
- President: William McKinley
- Preceded by: William E. Quinby
- Succeeded by: David Jayne Hill

Personal details
- Born: June 7, 1839 Providence, Rhode Island, U.S.
- Died: April 6, 1907 (aged 67) St. Paul, Minnesota, U.S.
- Party: Republican
- Education: Yale University; Harvard Law School

Stanford Newel (June 7, 1839 – April 6, 1907) was an American attorney and diplomat who served as United States Ambassador to the Netherlands and Luxembourg.

== Early life ==
Stanford Newel was born in Providence, Rhode Island on June 7, 1839. When he was 16, his family moved to St. Anthony, Minnesota, (now part of Minneapolis), and he was a resident of Minnesota for the rest of his life.

Newel graduated from Yale University in 1861 and Harvard Law School in 1864, afterwards practicing law in St. Paul.

== Career ==
A Republican, Newel served as a Delegate to numerous city, county and state conventions. He served as Chairman of the Minnesota Republican Party for six years, and was a Delegate to the Republican National Conventions of 1884 and 1892.

In 1897 President William McKinley appointed Newel as Ambassador to the Netherlands, and he served until 1905. During his time in the Netherlands, Newel was a Delegate to the Hague Convention of 1899.

In 1903 Newel was named United States Ambassador to Luxembourg. He was the first individual to hold this position, and served while continuing to carry out his responsibilities as Ambassador to the Netherlands.

== Personal life ==
After leaving the Netherlands, Newel lived in retirement in St. Paul, where he died on April 6, 1907.

Diplomatic posts
Preceded by William E. Quinby	U.S. Minister to the Netherlands; 1897–1905	Succeeded by David Jayne Hill
