= George Folsom =

American politician

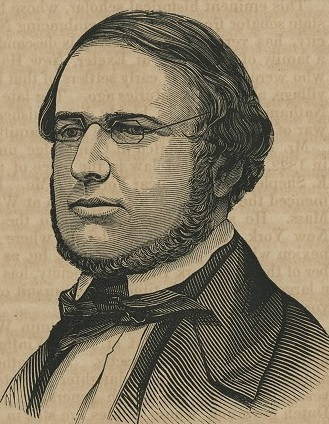

U.S. Chargé d'affaires to the Netherlands
- In office 1850–1853
- Preceded by: Auguste Davezac
- Succeeded by: August Belmont

Member of the New York State Senate First District (Class 2)
- In office 1845–1847
- Preceded by: John B. Scott
- Succeeded by: District abolished

Personal details
- Born: May 23, 1802 Kennebunk, Maine, U.S.
- Died: March 27, 1869 (aged 66) Rome, Kingdom of Italy
- Spouse: Margaret Cornelia Winthrop (m. 1839; died 1863)
- Children: 3
- Education: Phillips Exeter Academy
- Alma mater: Harvard College

George Folsom (May 23, 1802 – March 27, 1869) was an American lawyer, historian, librarian, diplomat and senator from New York.

== Early life ==
Folsom was born on May 23, 1802, in Kennebunk, York County, District of Maine. He was the son of Thomas Folsom (1769–1844), a jeweler and tavern-keeper, and Edna (née Ela) Folsom (1775–1851). The family moved to Portland, Maine in 1809.

George was educated at Phillips Academy, Andover, MA, and graduated from Harvard College in 1822. Then he studied law with U.S. Attorney Ether Shepley in Saco, Maine, was admitted to the bar, and practiced in Worcester, Massachusetts.

== Career ==
While studying law he prepared the History of Saco and Biddeford (on-line copy; 331 pages) which was published in 1830. In 1831 he was elected a member of the American Antiquarian Society, and was a member of its publishing committee from 1834 to 1837.

About 1837, he removed to New York City, and practiced law there. He also became a member of the New York Historical Society, and was chosen the society's librarian, and one of the secretaries. In 1843, he translated and published The Despatches of Hernando Cortes (on-line copy; 431 pages).

He was an American Republican member of the New York State Senate (1st D.) from 1845 to 1847, sitting in the 68th, 69th and 70th New York State Legislatures. At the 1846 New York state election, he ran on the American ticket for Lieutenant Governor of New York. He was U.S. Chargé d'affaires to the Netherlands from 1850 to 1853.

In 1860, he received the honorary degree of Doctor of law from the University of Vermont.

== Personal life ==
In 1839, Folsom was married to Margaret Cornelia Winthrop (1801–1863), a daughter of Benjamin Winthrop and Judith (née Stuyvesant) Winthrop of New York City. Margaret was a descendant of Peter Stuyvesant, the last Dutch Director-General of New Netherland, and John Winthrop, the 3rd Governor the Massachusetts Bay Colony. Together, they were the parents of three children:

- Margaret Winthrop Folsom (1842–1925), who was committed to an insane asylum when she was twenty-seven.
- Helen Stuyvesant Folsom (1843–1882), who became Sister Helen Margaret, CSJB.
- George Winthrop Folsom (1846–1915), who married Frances Elizabeth Fuller.

Folsom died on March 27, 1869, in Rome, Italy. He was buried at St. Mark's Church in-the-Bowery.

New York State Senate
Preceded by John B. Scott	New York State Senate; First District (Class 2); 1845–1847	Succeeded by district abolished
Diplomatic posts
Preceded by Auguste Davezac	U.S. Chargé d'affaires to the Netherlands; 1850–1853	Succeeded by August Belmont
