= Embassy of the United States, The Hague =

Diplomatic mission of the United States in the Netherlands

Embassy of the United States in The Hague
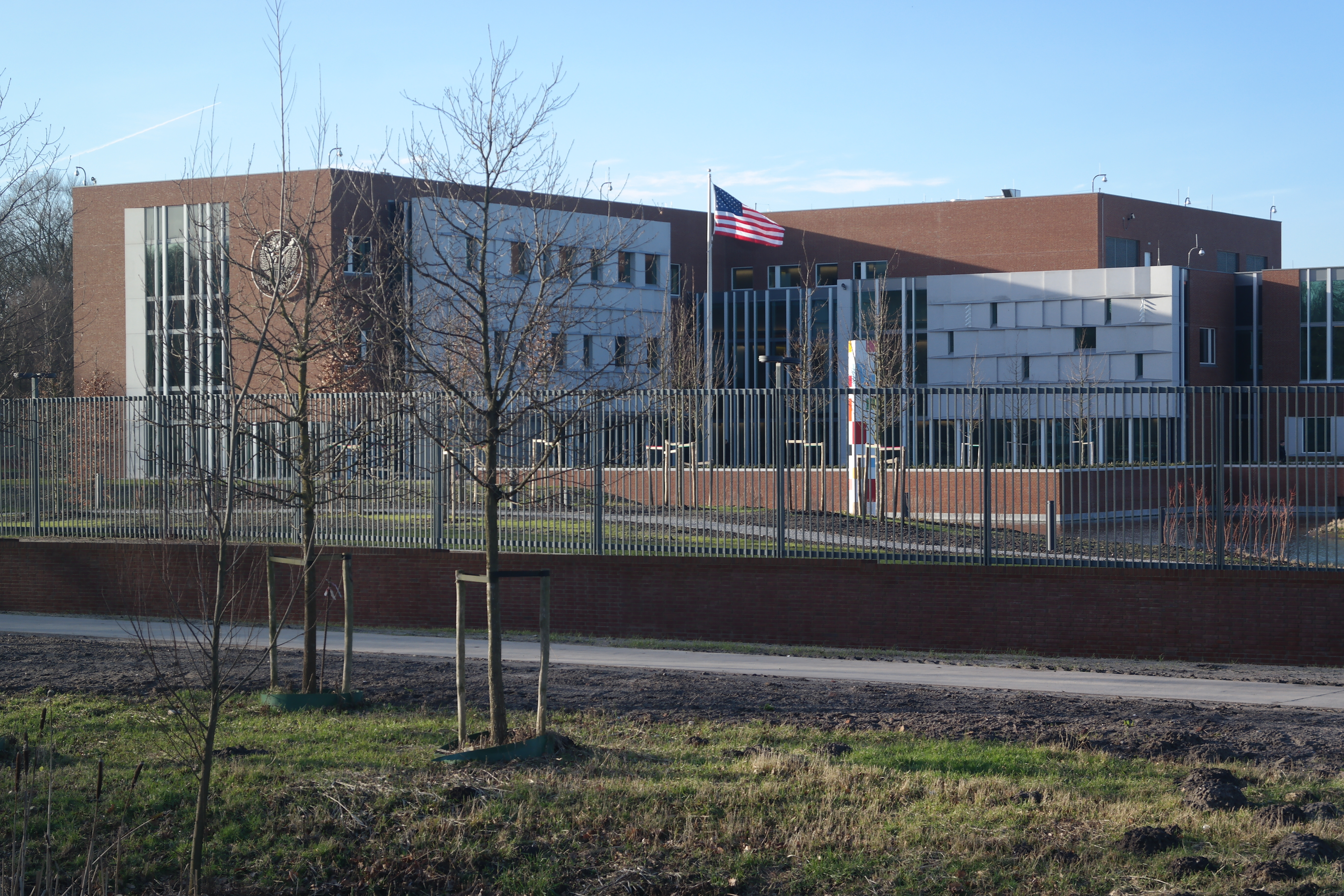
- Embassy in Wassenaar, bordering The Hague, in 2018
- Location: John Adams Park 1 Wassenaar, Netherlands
- Coordinates: 52.0996°N 4.3437°E
- Inaugurated: January 29, 2018
- Website: nl.usembassy.gov

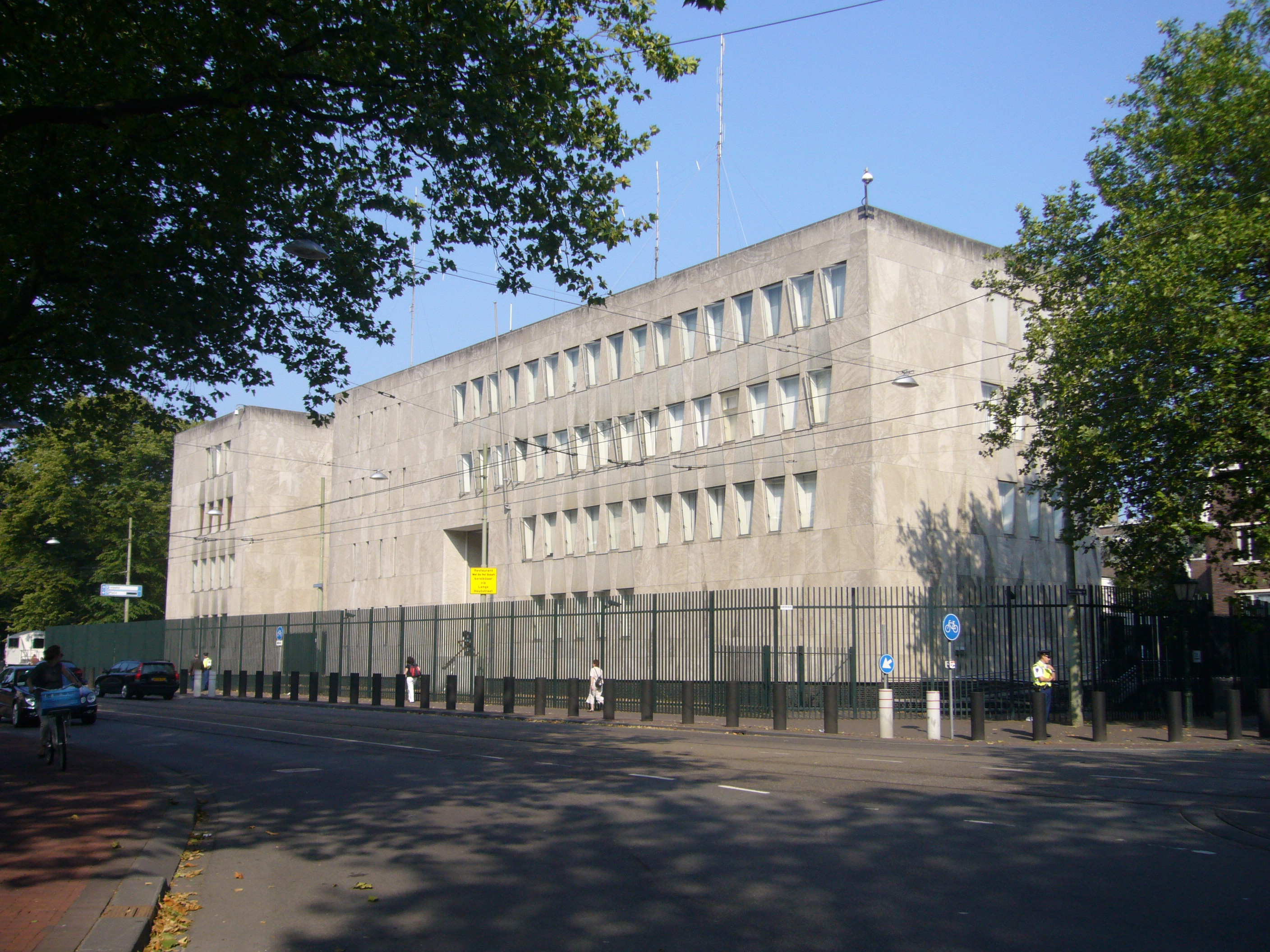
Former embassy at the Lange Voorhout in The Hague (2009)
Interactive map of
52.0826°N 4.3151°E
Location	Lange Voorhout 102; The Hague, Netherlands
Site notes
Architect	Marcel Breuer
Rijksmonument
Designated	2017
Reference no.	532222

The Embassy of the United States in The Hague (Dutch: Ambassade van de Verenigde Staten van Amerika in Den Haag) is the diplomatic mission of the United States in the Netherlands. It is located at John Adams Park 1 in Wassenaar, on the municipal border with The Hague.

The current American embassy building in Wassenaar opened on January 29, 2018. It replaced the former embassy building at the Lange Voorhout 102 in The Hague, which was opened on July 4, 1959; it housed the U.S. diplomatic mission to the Netherlands for nearly 60 years. This building in The Hague's city center was designed by architect Marcel Breuer and was designated a national monument in 2017.

Notable Americans such as former Presidents John Adams and John Quincy Adams, General Hugh Ewing and Iraq Envoy L. Paul Bremer have held the title of United States Ambassador to the Netherlands.
