= Auguste Davezac =

American diplomat

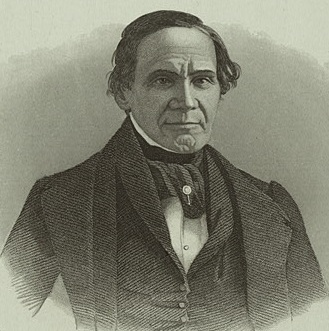
- Engraving by J. B. Forrest (New York City), circa 1842

U.S. Minister to the Netherlands
- In office 1831–1839
- Preceded by: William Pitt Preble
- Succeeded by: Harmanus Bleecker

Member of the New York State Assembly
- In office 1842–1843

Member of the New York State Assembly
- In office 1844–1845

U.S. Minister to the Netherlands
- In office 1845–1850
- Preceded by: Christopher Hughes
- Succeeded by: George Folsom

Personal details
- Born: May 30, 1780 Aux Cayes, Saint-Domingue (now Haiti)
- Died: February 15, 1851 (aged 70) New York City, New York
- Resting place: Calvary Cemetery in Queens
- Party: Democratic-Republican Party; Democratic Party
- Spouse: Margaret Andrews (1768-1847) (m. 1803)
- Relations: Edward Livingston (brother in law)
- Children: Auguste Davezac Jr. (1803-1859)
- Parent(s): Jean Pierre Valentin Joseph d'Avezac de Castera (1756-1803); Marie Rose Genevieve Valentine Tallarie de Maragou (b. 1768)
- Education: College de Sorèze; French Military College
- Profession: Attorney; Diplomat

Auguste Davezac (May 30, 1780 – February 15, 1851) was a Saint Dominican-American diplomat who served twice as United States Ambassador to the Netherlands.

== Biography ==
Auguste Genevieve Valentin D'Avezac was born in May, 1780, near Aux Cayes in the French colony of Saint-Domingue, now Haiti. His father was a wealthy landowner, and he was educated in France at the College de Sorèze and the French Military College. In 1791, the slaves of Saint-Domingue revolted, which resulted in the deaths of Auguste's two older brothers, with the rest of his family fleeing to Virginia and New Orleans. In 1805, Davezac's sister Louise married Edward Livingston. Ten years later, their younger sister Aglae Pauline married Judge Henry Cox Carleton of New Orleans.

Davezac completed his education in France and moved to the United States shortly after Louise's marriage, studying medicine in Edenton, North Carolina, and establishing a practice in Accomack County, Virginia. He changed the spelling of his last name (eliminating the apostrophe), decided to abandon medicine for the law and relocated to New Orleans to study under Livingston. Davezac built a successful practice and was a sought-after criminal defense attorney.

During the War of 1812, Davezac served on the local defense committee established by the residents of New Orleans. In 1814 he joined the staff of Andrew Jackson as aide-de-camp and judge advocate with the rank of Major, the title by which he was addressed for the rest of his life. Davezac participated in the Battle of New Orleans As a result of his War of 1812 experience Davezac became a devoted admirer and political supporter of Jackson, campaigning actively for him in both the 1824 and 1828 campaigns for President.

In 1829 Jackson rewarded Davezac with appointment as Secretary of the United States embassy in the Netherlands, where he served under William Pitt Preble. In 1831 Edward Livingston became Secretary of State and Davezac succeeded Preble, serving as Chargé d'affaires until 1839.

Davezac returned to New Orleans, but soon relocated to New York City, where he was active in Martin Van Buren's unsuccessful 1840 campaign for reelection. In the early 1840s Davezac was elected to two terms in the New York State Assembly as a Democrat, 1842 to 1843, and 1844 to 1845.

In 1844 Davezac supported Van Buren's efforts to win the Democratic nomination for President, and campaigned extensively for the eventual nominee, James K. Polk. When Polk won the presidency, he rewarded Davezac by reappointing him as Chargé d'affaires in the Netherlands, where he served from 1845 to 1850.

After leaving office Davezac returned to New York City, where he lived in retirement for only a few months before he became ill and died on February 15, 1851. He was buried at Calvary Cemetery in Queens.

Diplomatic posts
Preceded by William Pitt Preble	U.S. Minister to the Netherlands; 1831–1839	Succeeded by Harmanus Bleecker
Preceded by Christopher Hughes	U.S. Minister to the Netherlands; 1845–1850	Succeeded by George Folsom
