= Alexander Hill Everett =

American diplomat

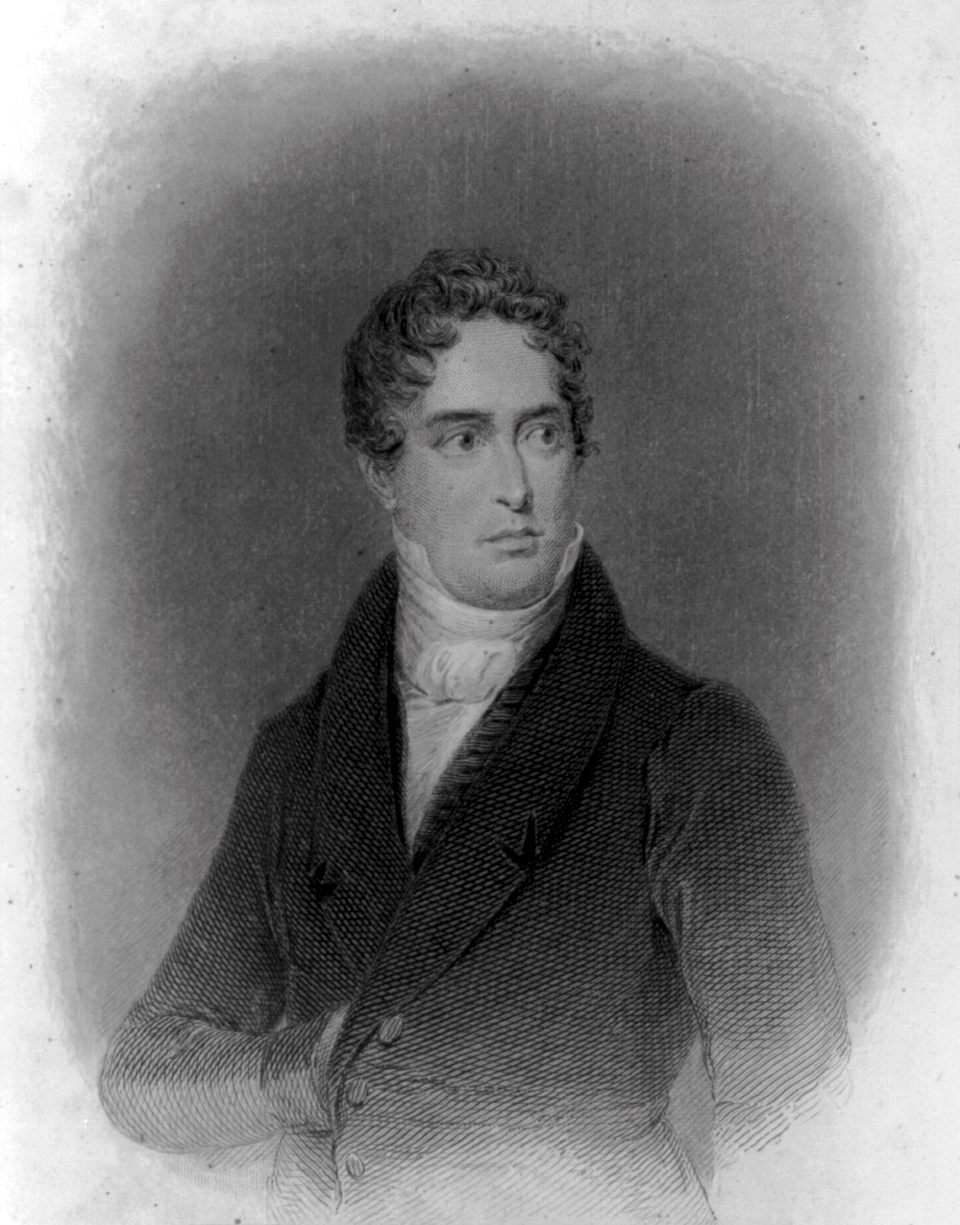

8th United States chargé d'affaires in the Netherlands
- In office January 4, 1819 – June 7, 1824
- Appointed by: James Monroe
- Preceded by: William Eustis
- Succeeded by: Christopher Hughes

7th United States Minister to Spain
- In office September 4, 1825 – August 1, 1829
- Appointed by: John Quincy Adams
- Preceded by: Hugh Nelson
- Succeeded by: Cornelius P. Van Ness

2nd United States Commissioner to the Great Qing Empire
- In office July 4, 1845 – June 28, 1847
- Appointed by: James K. Polk
- Preceded by: Caleb Cushing
- Succeeded by: John Wesley Davis

Personal details
- Born: March 19, 1790 Boston, Massachusetts, United States
- Died: June 29, 1847 (aged 57) Guangzhou, China
- Party: National Republican; Democrat (after 1836)
- Spouse: Lucretia Orne Peabody (1786-1862)
- Relations: Edward Everett (brother)
- Education: Harvard College
- Profession: Lawyer, editor, diplomat, author

Alexander Hill Everett (March 19, 1792 – June 28, 1847) was an American diplomat, politician, and Boston man of letters. Everett held diplomatic posts in the Netherlands, Spain, Cuba, and China. His translations of European literature, published in the North American Review, were influential for the Transcendentalism movement.

== Biography ==
Everett was born in Boston, Massachusetts to Lucy Hill and Oliver Everett, who was at that time the minister of the New South Church. The Everetts were a prominent Massachusetts family: through his father, Alexander was a descendant of Richard Everett (1597 – 1682), one of the earliest settlers of Dedham, Massachusetts. Alexander's younger brother, Edward Everett, would go on to serve as the 15th Governor of Massachusetts and Secretary of State. Alexander graduated from Harvard College in 1806, the youngest and best in his class. After leaving College he was an assistant teacher in Phillips Exeter Academy for one year, then studied law in the office of John Quincy Adams. In 1809 he accompanied Adams to Russia, where he lived for two years as Adam's personal secretary in the legation.

At the close of the War of 1812, Governor of Massachusetts William Eustis was appointed minister to the Netherlands, and Everett accompanied him as secretary of legation, but after a year of service returned home. On the retirement of Governor Eustis from the legation, however, Everett was appointed his successor, with the rank of chargé d'affaires to The Hague, which post he held from 1818 till 1824. Everett used his time to write a book on European affairs, published in 1821 as Europe; or, A General Survey of the Present Situation of the Principal Powers; with Conjectures on Their Future Prospects. In it Everett described the Netherlands as "a decayed and decaying nation" whose creation had been an error and predicted that it would eventually disappear in the sea. After Adams became president in 1825, he appointed Everett minister to Spain, from 1825 to 1829.

As ambassador to Spain, Everett maintained the United States' concern with Cuba as a nearby slaveholding colony. He wrote in November 1825 that it would be unacceptable for the island to become part of newly independent Mexico or Colombia, citing his feelings that the island's black population was too large. For the same reasons, he also opposed Cuban independence.

After his service in Spain, he returned to Boston and obtained a controlling interest in North American Review (to which he had been an active contributor while his brother was editor) and shortly afterward succeeded Jared Sparks as principal editor. The venture was not financially rewarding. Everett was elected a Fellow of the American Academy of Arts and Sciences in 1824 and the American Philosophical Society in 1830.

Everett's government service was not yet over, though, and he sat in the legislature of Massachusetts from 1830 till 1835. His political fortunes in Massachusetts plummeted when, after serving in the state legislature, Everett switched parties from Whig to Democrat and was blamed for his brother Edward's loss in his bid for reelection as governor in 1839. In 1840 Everett served in Cuba as a Special Diplomatic Agent of the United States. While in Cuba he was appointed president of Jefferson College, Louisiana, but was soon obliged by failing health to return to New England.

On the return of Caleb Cushing from his mission to China, Everett was appointed the next commissioner and sailed for Canton on July 4, 1845. He was detained by illness at Rio de Janeiro, and returned home. In the summer of 1846 he made a second and more successful attempt to reach his destination, but died in Canton shortly after his arrival, on June 28, 1847. He was buried at the foreigners' cemetery on Changzhou Island, in Guangzhou, China.

== Major works ==
- Europe; or, A General Survey of the Present Situation of the Principal Powers; with Conjectures on Their Future Prospects. Boston: Oliver Everett, Cummings and Hillard, 1822.
- New Ideas on Population: With Remarks on the Theories of Malthus and Godwin. Boston: Cummings, Hilliard and Co., 1823; 2nd ed., 1826. Reprint. New York: Augustus M. Kelley, 1970.
- America: or, A General Survey of the Political Situation of the Several Powers of the Western Continent, with Conjectures on Their Future Prospects. Philadelphia: H. C. Carey and I. Lea, 1827.
- Strictures on Nullification. Boston: Stimpson and Clapf, 1832.
- Critical and Miscellaneous Essays. 2 vols. Boston: J. Monroe and Company, 1845–1846.

Diplomatic posts
Preceded by William Eustis	U.S. Minister to the Netherlands; 1819–1824	Succeeded by Christopher Hughes
Preceded by Hugh Nelson	U.S. Minister to Spain; 1825–1829	Succeeded by Cornelius P. Van Ness
Preceded by Caleb Cushing	U.S. Minister to China; 1819–1824	Succeeded by John Wesley Davis
