= Marja Verloop =

American diplomat

The Honorable Marja Verloop

United States Ambassador to the Netherlands
- In office January 17, 2021 – July 4, 2022
- President: Donald Trump; Joe Biden
- Preceded by: Pete Hoekstra
- Succeeded by: Aleisha Woodward

Personal details
- Born: Netherlands
- Children: 2
- Education: University of Southern California; University of Washington; Johns Hopkins School of Advanced International Studies

Marja D. Verloop is an American career diplomat. She was the Chargé d'Affaires, and thus acting Ambassador, from the United States to the Netherlands.

== Early life ==
Verloop was born in the Netherlands, but raised and educated in the United States. She earned a B.A. degree from the University of Southern California and a M.A. degree from the University of Washington. She also took post-graduate courses at the Johns Hopkins School of Advanced International Studies.

== Career ==
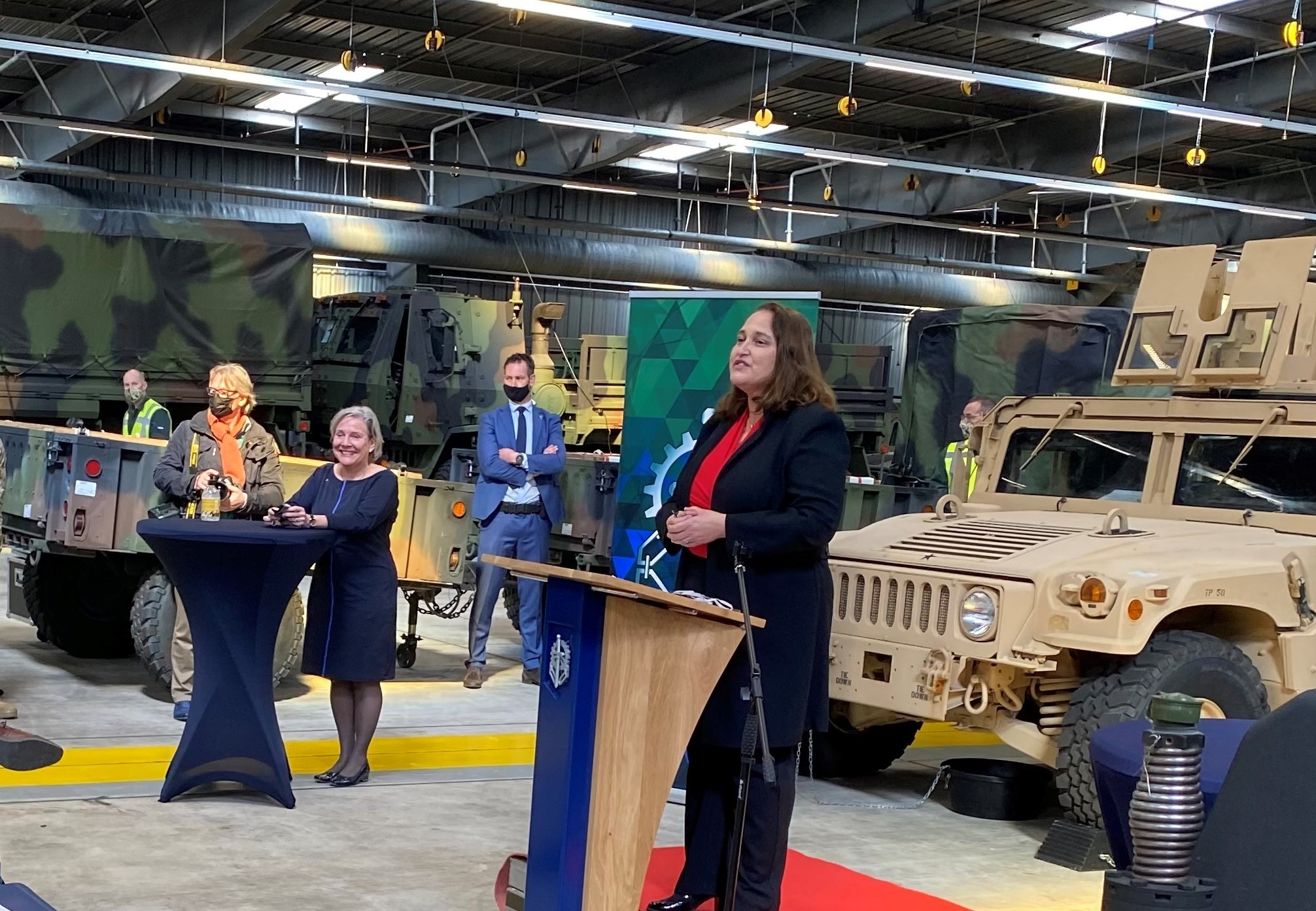
Verloop, as chargé d’Affaires and acting U.S. Ambassador to the Netherlands, 24 March 2021

Verloop joined the U.S. Department of State in 1998 and, since then, has had a number of assignments in Washington, D.C., and at overseas embassies, including positions in New Delhi (in India), Ottawa (in Canada), Windhoek (in Namibia), Kuala Lumpur (in Malaysia), and Warsaw (in Poland). In the U.S., she served as a Congressional Fellow, as a desk officer to the European Union, a negotiator in the Office of Global Change, and as the State Department's Director for Innovation. She has also served as Deputy Executive Director for the Bureau of East Asian and Pacific Affairs, with responsibility for forty-five overseas posts and twelve domestic offices.

=== Ambassador to the Netherlands ===
Verloop arrived in the Netherlands in June 2019 to serve as Deputy Chief of Mission. She assumed responsibility as chargé d'affaires on January 17, 2021.

== Personal life ==
Verloop is married and has two children.
