= William C. Somerville =

American diplomat

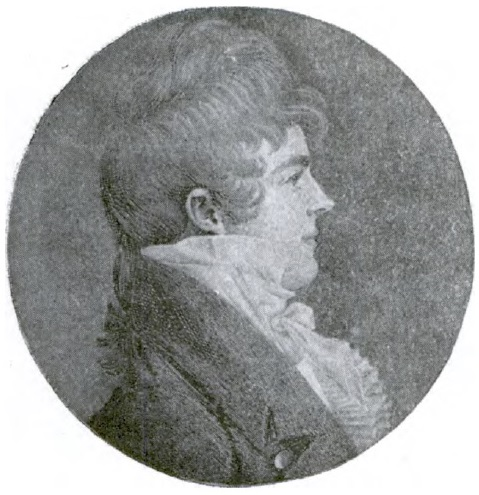

William Clarke Somerville (March 25, 1790 – January 5, 1826) was an author, historian, diplomat, American plantation owner and militia officer in the War of 1812.

== Life and career ==
William Clarke Somerville was born in St. Mary's County, Maryland on March 25, 1790. His family had been prominent in colonial Maryland, and his father William Somerville (1755–1806) was a militia officer before and during the American Revolution, and served in the Maryland House of Delegates and as Judge of the county Orphans Court.

The younger Somerville was educated by his parents and became involved in managing his family's plantations. At different times in his life he owned: Mulberry Fields, which he inherited from his father; Sotterley, which he won from his brother in law in a dice game; and Stratford Hall, the birthplace of Robert E. Lee. He later renamed Mulberry Fields to Montalbino.

During the War of 1812 Somerville served in the 12th Regiment of Maryland Militia, based in St. Mary's County, and attained the rank of Major.

Following the war Somerville made an extended tour of Europe, and established several friendships with political, military and society figures that he maintained until the end of his life. As a result of his time in France, he penned a history, entitled Letters from Paris, on the Causes and Consequences of the French Revolution which was first published in Baltimore in 1822.

To capitalize on Somerville's contacts, in 1825 President John Quincy Adams appointed him to be Minister to Sweden and directed him to carry out a diplomatic assignment in Greece before proceeding to Stockholm.

While en route to Greece, Somerville became ill while staying at Château de la Grange-Bléneau, the estate of the Marquis de Lafayette in Courpalay, France. He died there on January 5, 1826, and was buried on the estate.

== Personal life ==
Somerville never married. He was first engaged to Sarah Conyers, who died in the 1811 Richmond Theatre fire. He was later engaged to Coralie (Cora) Livingston (1806–1873), the daughter of Edward Livingston, but died without marrying her.

William C. Somerville's will, which Lafayette sent to Somerville's family, named William's brother Henry V. Somerville as beneficiary. William Somerville's assets consisted chiefly of the plantations he still owned and the slaves who worked on them. (Before the War of 1812 he had owned nearly 50.) In his will William Somerville left detailed instructions for the gradual manumission of his slaves, and provisions for one to immediately purchase his freedom from Henry Somerville.
