= List of ambassadors of the United States to the Czech Republic =

Ambassador of the United States to the Czech Republic
- Seal of the United States Department of State

- Flag of a United States ambassador

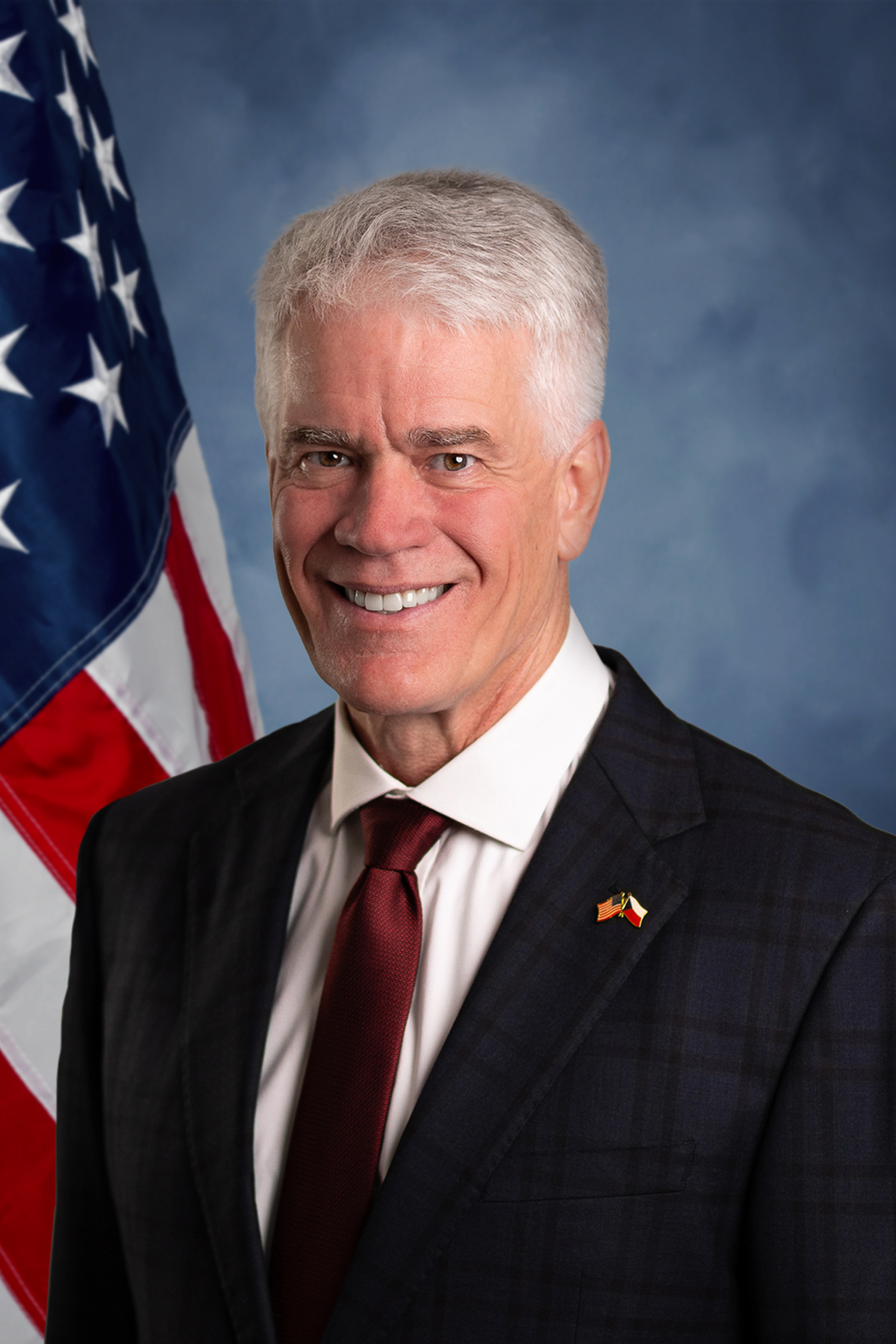
- Incumbent; Nicholas Merrick since October 23, 2025
- Nominator: The president of the United States
- Appointer: The president with Senate advice and consent
- Inaugural holder: Adrian A. Basora as Ambassador Extraordinary and Plenipotentiary
- Formation: June 15, 1992
- Website: U.S. Embassy - Prague

The diplomatic post of United States ambassador to the Czech Republic was created after the dissolution of Czechoslovakia and the United States recognizing the new nation of the Czech Republic on January 1, 1993.

In June 1992, the Slovak parliament voted to declare sovereignty and the Czech-Slovak federation dissolved peacefully on January 1, 1993. The United States recognized the Czech Republic and Slovakia as independent nations and moved to establish diplomatic relations. The previous ambassador to Czechoslovakia, Adrian A. Basora, continued as the ambassador to the Czech Republic and Theodore Russell, who served as deputy chief of mission under Ambassador Shirley Temple Black, became the first U.S. ambassador to Slovakia later that year.

== Ambassadors ==
Name	Title	Appointed	Presented credentials	Terminated mission	Notes
Adrian A. Basora	Ambassador Extraordinary and Plenipotentiary	June 15, 1992	July 20, 1992	July 15, 1995	
Jenonne R. Walker	Ambassador Extraordinary and Plenipotentiary	June 27, 1995	August 31, 1995	August 31, 1998	
John Shattuck	Ambassador Extraordinary and Plenipotentiary	October 22, 1998	December 10, 1998	December 16, 2000	
Craig Roberts Stapleton	Ambassador Extraordinary and Plenipotentiary	August 7, 2001	August 28, 2001	December 16, 2003	
William J. Cabaniss	Ambassador Extraordinary and Plenipotentiary	October 6, 2003	January 13, 2004	September 15, 2006	
Richard Graber	Ambassador Extraordinary and Plenipotentiary	September 14, 2006	October 12, 2006	January 20, 2009	
Mary Thompson-Jones	Chargés d’affaires ad interim	January 20, 2009	Unknown	May 2010	
John Ordway	Chargés d’affaires ad interim	May 2010	Unknown	August 2010	
Joseph Pennington	Chargés d’affaires ad interim	August 2010	Unknown	December 30, 2010	
Norman L. Eisen	Ambassador Extraordinary and Plenipotentiary	December 30, 2010	January 28, 2011	August 12, 2014	
Andrew H. Schapiro	Ambassador Extraordinary and Plenipotentiary	July 23, 2014	September 30, 2014	January 20, 2017	
Steve King	Ambassador Extraordinary and Plenipotentiary	October 18, 2017	December 6, 2017	January 20, 2021	
Jennifer Bachus	Chargés d’affaires ad interim	January 20, 2021		March 29, 2022	
Michael Dodman	Chargés d’affaires ad interim	March 29, 2022		August 18, 2022	
Christy Agor	Chargés d’affaires ad interim	August 18, 2022		January 31, 2023	
Bijan Sabet	Ambassador Extraordinary and Plenipotentiary	December 13, 2022	February 15, 2023	January 20, 2025	
Christy Agor	Chargés d’affaires ad interim	January 20, 2025		June 20, 2025	
David Wisner	Chargés d’affaires ad interim	June 20, 2025		October 20, 2025	
Nicholas Merrick	Ambassador Extraordinary and Plenipotentiary	October 7, 2025	October 23, 2025	Present	

== See also ==
- Embassy of the United States, Prague
- Czech Republic – United States relations
- Foreign relations of the Czech Republic
- Ambassadors of the United States
