= Norm Eisen =

American attorney, author and former diplomat

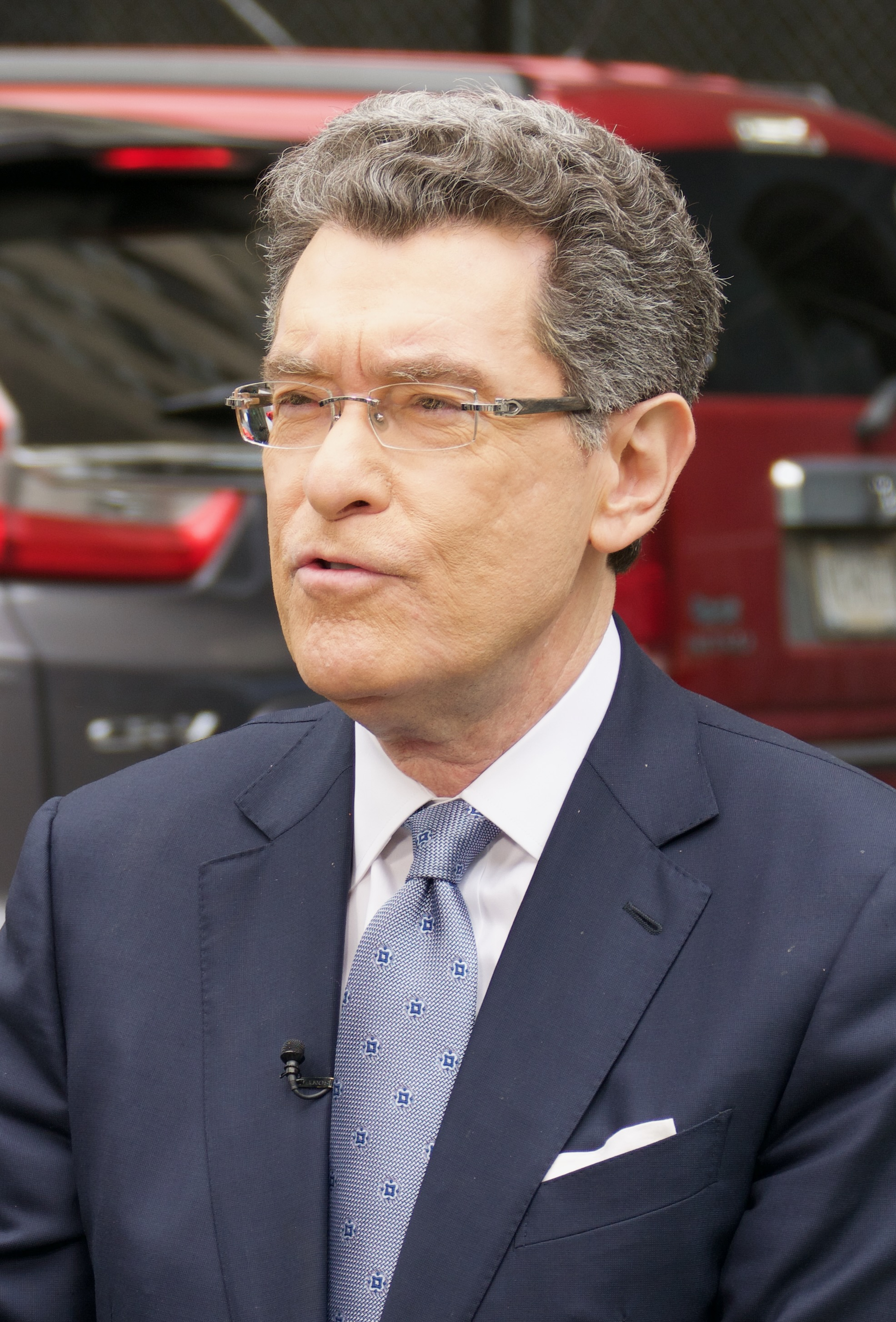
- Eisen in 2024

United States Ambassador to the Czech Republic
- In office January 28, 2011 – August 12, 2014
- President: Barack Obama
- Preceded by: Joseph Pennington (Acting)
- Succeeded by: Andrew H. Schapiro

Personal details
- Born: November 11, 1960 (age 65) Los Angeles, California, U.S.
- Party: Democratic
- Spouse: Lindsay Kaplan
- Education: Brown University (BA); Harvard University (JD)

Norman L. Eisen (born November 11, 1960) is an American attorney, author, and former diplomat. A senior fellow in governance studies at the Brookings Institution, he is a CNN legal analyst and co-founded the States United Democracy Center. He was co-counsel for the House Judiciary Committee during the first impeachment and trial of President Donald Trump in 2020. He served as White House Special Counsel for Ethics and Government Reform, United States Ambassador to the Czech Republic, and board chair of Citizens for Responsibility and Ethics in Washington (CREW). He is the author of four books, including The Last Palace: Europe's Turbulent Century in Five Lives and One Legendary House (2018). In 2022, he co-authored Overcoming Trumpery: How to Restore Ethics, the Rule of Law, and Democracy.

== Early life and education ==
Eisen's parents were both born abroad. His father immigrated in 1940 and joined the US Army and participated in the liberation of Europe. His mother was a survivor of the Czechoslovak Holocaust who immigrated to the United States following World War II. While growing up, he worked at his family's hamburger stand in Los Angeles. He attended Hollywood High School. He received his B.A. degree from Brown University in 1985 and his J.D. degree from Harvard Law School in 1991, graduating with honors from both. While at Harvard, he met then-future president Barack Obama, who was also a first-year law student, and then-future Supreme Court justice Neil Gorsuch.

== Professional career ==
=== Early career ===
From 1985 to 1988, between college and law school, Eisen worked as the assistant director of the Los Angeles office of the Anti-Defamation League. He investigated antisemitism and other civil rights violations, promoted Holocaust education, and advanced U.S.–Israel relations.

After graduation from Harvard in 1991, Eisen practiced law in Washington, D.C. for more than 18 years with the Zuckerman Spaeder law firm. He was named as one of Washington's top attorneys by Washingtonian magazine. He specialized in investigations of complex financial fraud, including Enron, Refco, the ADM antitrust case, and the subprime financial collapse.

In 2003, Eisen co-founded Citizens for Responsibility and Ethics in Washington (CREW), a government watchdog organization.

=== Obama administration ===
From 2007 to 2009, Eisen was active in the presidential campaign of his law school classmate Barack Obama before joining the transition team of then-President-elect Obama as deputy counsel. On January 20, 2009, Obama named him special counsel for ethics and government reform in the White House.

He earned the nickname "Dr. No" for his stringent ethics and anti-corruption efforts and became known for limiting registered lobbyists from taking positions in the administration. In Obama's autobiography, A Promised Land, he recalls an instance in which Eisen was asked which out-of-town conferences administration officials would be permitted to attend; Eisen replied, "If it sounds fun, you can't go." He is credited for helping compile President Obama's ethics-related campaign promises into an executive order the president signed on his first day in office.

During 2009 and 2010, Eisen also contributed to the administration's open government efforts, including putting the White House visitor logs on the internet to promote transparency; its response to the campaign finance decision in Citizens United v. FEC; and its financial regulatory plan, which is the basis for Dodd–Frank. His other activities included reviewing the background of potential administration officials and expanding the application of the Freedom of Information Act.

Eisen became the first ambassador to the Czech Republic nominated by President Obama. President Obama initially gave Eisen a recess appointment, the term of which was for only one year, until the end of 2011, unless the full U.S. Senate confirmed him. Recess appointment was required because of a hold on Eisen's nomination. The leaders of several Washington good-government groups authored a letter in support of the appointment of Eisen. Eisen's nomination received bipartisan support, including from Republican senators and conservative foreign policy scholars. The Senate ultimately confirmed Eisen on December 12, 2011.

As ambassador, he developed a "three pillars" approach to the U.S.–Czech relationship, emphasizing (1) strategic and defense cooperation; (2) commercial and economic ties; and (3) shared values. During his time as ambassador, he spent money out of his own wallet to maintain the ambassador's residence and entertain dignitaries.

Eisen visited Czech and U.S. troops serving side by side in Afghanistan. He advocated for U.S. business and saw bilateral trade increases of 50 percent with the Czech Republic during his tenure (more than three times the average for U.S. embassies in Europe at the time). He also spoke out against corruption and in defense of civil rights. Eisen has been credited with helping to deepen U.S.–Czech relations. He also supported the Middle East peace process, including posting the first investment conference on the "Kerry Plan" in Prague together with former British Prime Minister Tony Blair and former Secretary of State Madeleine Albright."

Eisen's ambassadorship was noteworthy because his mother, a Czechoslovak Holocaust survivor, had been deported by the Nazis from that country to Auschwitz. As Senator Joseph Lieberman noted in introducing Eisen at a Senate hearing: "It is indeed a profound historical justice... that the Ambassador's residence in Prague, which was originally built by a Jewish family that was forced to flee Prague by the Nazis, who... took over that house as their headquarters, now 70 years later, is occupied by Norman and his family... The story of Norm Eisen and his family and their path back to Europe is a classic American story, a reflection of what our country is about at its very best. And that is also precisely why the Ambassador has proven to be such an effective representative of our nation, our interests, and our values."

=== Subsequent work ===
He joined the Brookings Institution as a visiting fellow in September 2014. He became a senior fellow in their Governance Studies program and is the project chair of a research initiative on reducing corruption. At Brookings Eisen has contributed to reports on open government, the emoluments clause, presidential obstruction of justice, and anti-corruption efforts in the natural resource sector.

A prolific writer, he often contributes op-ed pieces to The New York Times, The Washington Post, Politico, USA Today, and other national publications.

From 2016 to 2019, Eisen served as chair of the board and co-counsel on litigation matters for CREW, including emoluments cases in New York and Maryland federal courts (CREW v. Trump and D.C. and Maryland v. Trump, respectively).

In 2017, Eisen was named number 11 on the Politico 50 list of thinkers shaping American politics. Eisen has also been named to the Forward 50 list of American Jews.

In September 2018, Crown published Eisen's The Last Palace: Europe's Turbulent Century in Five Lives and One Legendary House. It is a sweeping history of 1918 to 2018 as seen through the windows of the Villa Petschek, a Prague palace built by Jewish businessman Otto Petschek after World War I, occupied by the Nazis later, and then the residence the American ambassador in Prague during his term of office.

In February 2019, Eisen was appointed consultant to the United States House Committee on the Judiciary. He assisted the committee on oversight matters related to the Department of Justice, including impeachment, and other oversight and policy issues within the committee's jurisdiction. A columnist at The Washington Post called Eisen a "critical force in building the case for impeachment." Eisen later wrote a book about his time as special counsel.

He edited "Democracy's Defenders: U.S. Embassy Prague, the Fall of Communism in Czechoslovakia, and Its Aftermath" (2020) and authored "A Case for the American People: The United States v. Donald J. Trump" (2020).

With Colby Galliher, Eisen co-authored a book entitled, Overcoming Trumpery, which was published by Brookings Institution Press in 2022.

==== States United ====
Eisen was a co-founder of the States United Democracy Center in 2021, and in his States United capacity, he signed a bar complaint against John C. Eastman and an ethics complaint filed against Jenna Ellis for their roles in undermining the 2020 election results. He served as co-counsel on an amicus brief filed in opposition to Lindsey Graham's motion to quash a subpoena in the Fulton County Special Grand Jury investigation of attempts to overturn the 2020 election results in Georgia. Eisen has co-written reports for States United including a guide to the Electoral College vote count and the January 6, 2021, meeting of Congress.

With his States United co-founders, Joanna Lydgate and Christine Todd Whitman, Eisen was a winner of the 2022 Brown Democracy Medal, given by the McCourtney Institute for Democracy at Pennsylvania State University. Eisen departed States United in early 2024.

==== The Contrarian ====
In January 2025, Eisen and columnist Jen Rubin began authoring a Substack publication entitled The Contrarian. Along with the articles posted to the publication, he has posted brief videos to the newsletter to provide the readers with breaking news regarding litigation as it progresses and to share insights into the processes.

== In popular culture ==
Director Wes Anderson has credited Ambassador Eisen as an inspiration for the character of Deputy Kovacs in his 2014 film The Grand Budapest Hotel. Anderson told Jeff Goldblum, who played Deputy Kovacs, "that he should go to Prague and see Norm; this is your man... The character of the lawyer Kovacs in the film maintains the awareness of law and justice... the character is actually a kind of ethics czar for the whole film." This is a reference to another one of Eisen's White House nicknames: The Ethics Czar. Anderson again referred to Eisen in the closing scene of Isle of Dogs, captioning a character as ethics czar in the new government of Megasaki.

== Personal life ==
Eisen is married to Georgetown University professor Lindsay Kaplan with whom he has a daughter.

Diplomatic posts
Preceded by Joseph Pennington; Acting	United States Ambassador to the Czech Republic; 2011–2014	Succeeded by Andrew H. Schapiro
