= Christy Agor =

American diplomat

Christina Jeanne Agor, known professionally as Christy Agor, is an American diplomat who had served as chargé d'affaires and deputy chief of mission in the U.S. Embassy to the Czech Republic.

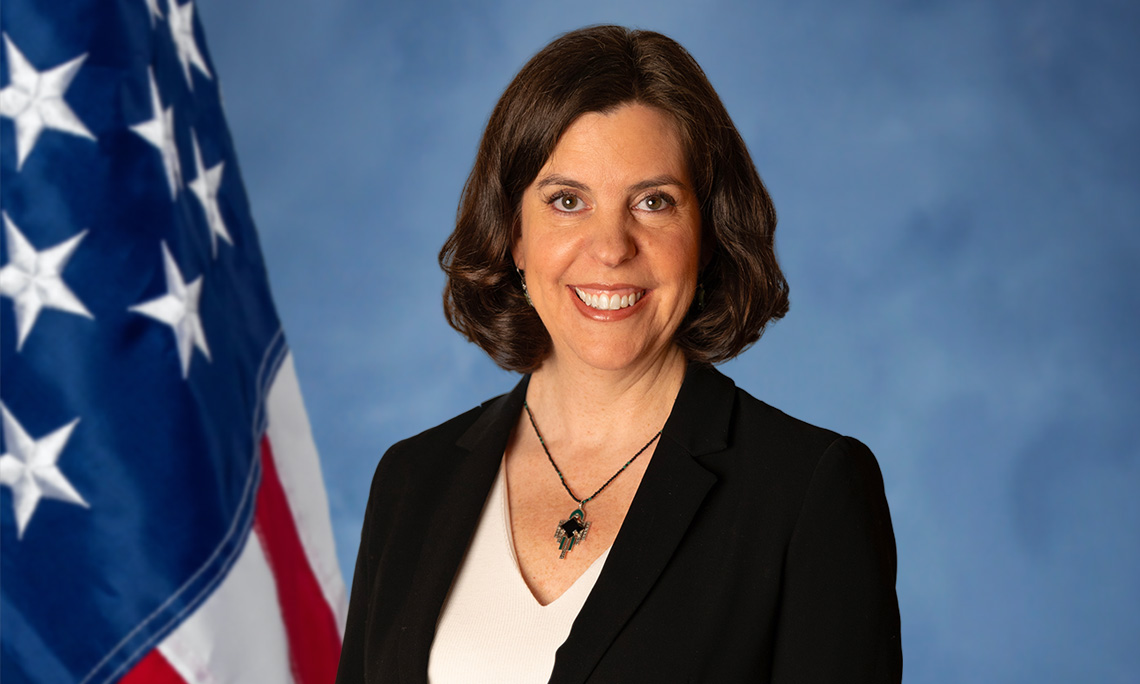

Originally from Rochester, New York, Agor graduated from Wellesley College with a degree in political science and government, as a member of the Phi Beta Kappa honor society. She had originally wanted to be a lawyer, but after interning at a law firm, she decided to pivot towards diplomacy. She joined the Foreign Service in 2000. She has served tours in Pakistan, Jerusalem, and Botswana. She has also worked as the Economic Counselor at the US Embassy in Spain, Deputy Principal Officer at the U.S. Consulate General in Istanbul, and Senior Watch Officer in the Operations Center. While in Washington D.C., she once served as Special Assistant to Secretary of State, Condoleezza Rice. Agor has studied Spanish, Turkish, Urdu, and Arabic.

In August 2022, Agor was appointed chargé d'affaires ad interim in Prague. She remained in this position until January 2023. She was replaced by Bijan Sabet, who officially presented his credentials that February. During her tenure as chargé, the Palacký University in Olomouc opened up an American Center in conjunction with the U.S. Embassy. Agor spoke at the opening ceremony and called the center proof of friendship between the two nations.

Sabet stepped down on January 20, 2025 with the inauguration of Donald Trump. Agor again served as interim chargé until Trump's appointee, Nicholas Merrick, was confirmed by the Senate in October of 2025.
