= Shefali Razdan Duggal =

American activist and diplomat (born 1971)

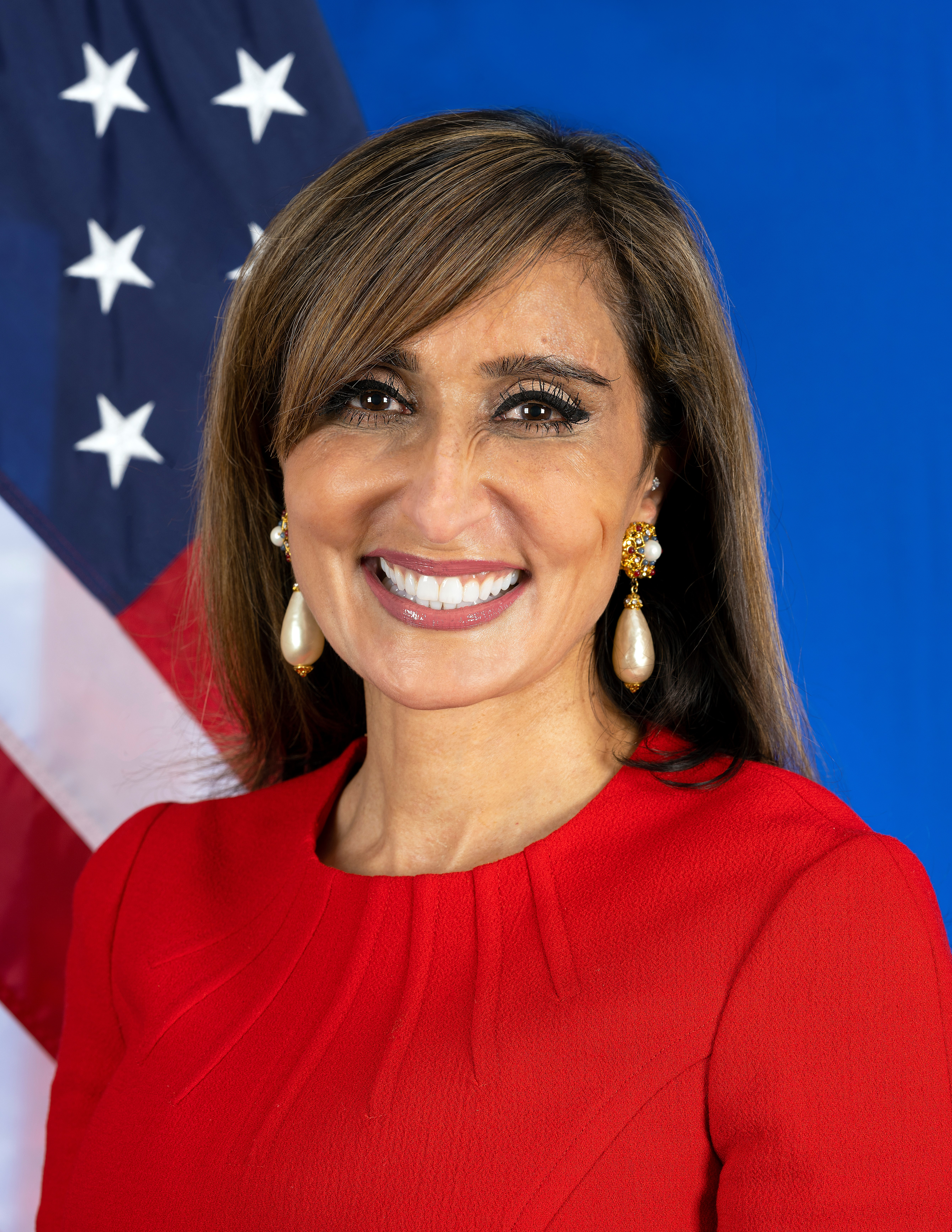
- Official portrait, 2022

United States Ambassador to the Netherlands
- In office October 19, 2022 – January 20, 2025
- President: Joe Biden
- Preceded by: Pete Hoekstra
- Succeeded by: Joseph Popolo Jr.

Personal details
- Born: Shefali Razdan; November 22, 1971 (age 55) Haridwar, Uttar Pradesh (now in Uttarakhand), India
- Party: Democratic
- Spouse: Rajat Duggal (m. 1998)
- Education: Miami University (BA); New York University - Steinhardt (MA)

Shefali Razdan Duggal (born November 22, 1971) is an Indian-American political activist and diplomat who served as the United States ambassador to the Netherlands from 2022 to 2025. She was previously appointed by President Barack Obama to the United States Holocaust Memorial Council, which supervises the United States Holocaust Memorial Museum, for a term which expired in January 2018.

Razdan Duggal served on the board of Emily's List, served as a deputy national finance director of the Democratic National Committee and served on the National Finance Committee of Joe Biden for President 2020.

Razdan Duggal is currently a Columbia University Lamont-Doherty Distinguished Fellow teaching the course “Politics, Policy and Diplomacy of Climate." She is currently a member of the Council on Foreign Relations, Center for American Progress (International Policy Advisory Council), Council of American Ambassadors, Human Rights Watch Europe & Central Asia (ECA) Advisory Committee, Women’s Foreign Policy Group (WFPG), Women’s Foreign Policy Network, USC Center on Public Diplomacy Advisory Board, Leadership & Character Council at Wake Forest University, The Diplomacy Project Leadership Council (Georgetown University) and a Board Member of the Netherlands America Foundation.

== Early life and education ==
A Kashmiri Pandit born in Haridwar, Uttar Pradesh (present day Uttarakhand), Razdan Duggal moved to the United States at the age of two and grew up in Cincinnati, Ohio. She was raised by a single mom, who worked two minimum wage jobs to support the family, working hard as a seamstress during the day and cutting vegetables at the local grocery store in the evening. Shefali became a naturalized U.S. citizen on November 16, 1990. Ambassador Razdan Duggal holds a Bachelor of Science degree in mass communication, with a minor in political science from Miami University in Oxford, Ohio, and a Master of Arts degree in media ecology from New York University. She also received an honorary doctorate from Miami University.

== Career ==
Razdan Duggal began her career in politics volunteering for the Massachusetts Democratic Party and the New Hampshire Democratic Party before moving on to volunteer for Senator Ted Kennedy and Senator Dianne Feinstein. Razdan Duggal started her work in presidential campaigns with the Al Gore 2000 presidential campaign, where she was a volunteer and at-large delegate representing the Commonwealth of Massachusetts. Following the 2000 United States presidential election, she worked for Staton Hughes, a political strategy firm, as a Political Analyst and also became a graduate of Emerge America, a political leadership training program for Democratic women.

After a brief hiatus from political activity, Razdan Duggal returned to politics by participating in outreach and fundraising efforts for Hillary Clinton’s 2008 presidential campaign. She was involved with Women for Hillary and served on the Northern California Steering Committee. Following Clinton’s loss in the Democratic primaries, Razdan Duggal joined Barack Obama’s campaign as a member of the Obama for America National Finance Committee.

While working with President Obama’s campaign, she also supported Kamala Harris’s successful bid for California attorney general and later served on Harris’s transition team.

During the 2012 United States presidential election, Razdan Duggal worked for the Barack Obama 2012 presidential campaign as part of the National Finance Committee, an Obama Victory Trustees co-chair, and a Northern California Finance Committee member. During the 2012 Democratic National Convention, Shefali was a member of the Credentials Standing Committee and an at-large delegate representing the state of California.

Razdan Duggal was a National Finance Committee member for the Hillary Clinton 2016 presidential campaign. During the 2016 Democratic National Convention, Razdan Duggal was a member of the Rules Standing Committee. She was mentioned in a New York Times article in 2016 as some of her emails were included in the 2016 Democratic National Committee email leak that were released by WikiLeaks.

During the 2020 United States presidential election, Razdan Duggal worked on the National Finance Committee of the Joe Biden 2020 presidential campaign and as a national co-chair of women for Biden. She was a vice chair of the Credentials Standing Committee and an at-large delegate representing the state of California at the 2020 Democratic National Convention.

=== United States ambassador to the Netherlands ===
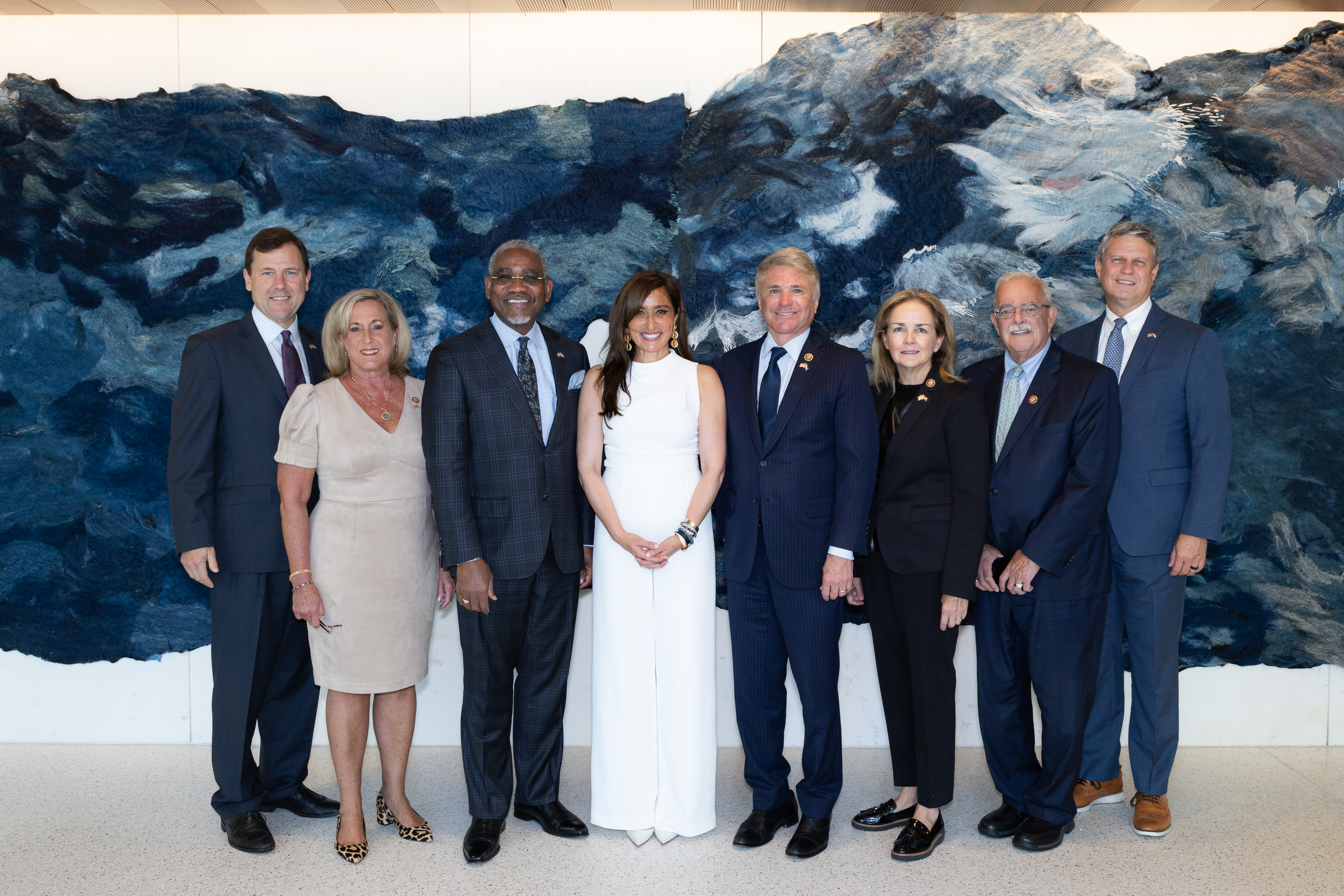
Razdan Duggal with members of the 118th Congress.

On March 11, 2022, President Joe Biden nominated Razdan Duggal to be the United States ambassador to the Netherlands. The Senate Foreign Relations Committee held hearings on her nomination on July 28, 2022. The committee favorably reported her nomination to the Senate floor on August 3, 2022, and it was approved by the full Senate on September 14, 2022.

She was sworn in as the U.S. ambassador to the Kingdom of the Netherlands on September 20, 2022, and presented her credentials to King Willem-Alexander on October 19, 2022.

On International Women's Day, March 8, 2024, the Dutch honored her by naming a fuchsia pink tulip after her (the "Tulipa Shefali") making her the first ambassador to the Netherlands, from any country, to receive such a tribute. That same year, she was nominated for the U.S. Department of State’s Sue M. Cobb Award for Exemplary Diplomatic Service for her work representing the United States in the Netherlands, the first U.S. Ambassador to the Netherlands to receive this nomination.

== Affiliations ==
- Democratic National Committee, Deputy National Finance Chair
- Emily's List, Board Member
- Columbia University, Lamont-Doherty Distinguished Fellow
- Human Rights First, Board of Advocates
- Human Rights Watch, California Committee North Board
- Human Rights Watch, Europe & Central Asia (ECA) Advisory Committee
- Miami University Inside Washington, National Advisory Board
- United States Holocaust Memorial Council, Western Region Advisor
- Wake Forest University Leadership and Character Council, Board member
- Netherlands America Foundation, Board Member
- USC Center on Public Diplomacy, Advisory Council
- Council on Foreign Relations, Member
- Center for American Progress, Member
- Foreign Policy for America, Member
- Pacific Council on International Policy, Member
- Chicago Council on Global Affairs, Member
- USC Center on Public Diplomacy, Advisory Council
- The Diplomacy Project Leadership Council (Georgetown University)
- Meridian International Center, Member
- Netherland-America Foundation, Board member

== Personal life ==
Ambassador Razdan Duggal lives in San Francisco and is married with two adult children.

Diplomatic posts
Preceded by Pete Hoekstra	United States Ambassador to the Netherlands; 2022–2025	Succeeded by Joseph Popolo Jr.
