= Netherlands–American Amity Trust =

The Netherlands–American Amity Trust (shortened to NAAT) was an organization dedicated to an educational and cultural exchange between the Netherlands and the United States. It dissolved in 2004 and has since been a part of the Netherlands–America Foundation.

The trust was founded in Washington, D.C. in 1980 with Ambassador J. William Middendorf II acting as its chairman. The occasion was for preparation of celebrations to commemorate 200 years of diplomatic relations between the Netherlands and the United States in 1982.

== Publications ==
- American Life in American Prints : exhibition, by James Tanis and Jane Lamb Bonner, 1982
- A guide to Dutch art in America, by Peter C. Sutton, 1986.
- Pamphlets, Printing, and Political Culture in the Early Dutch Republic, by C. Harline, 1987
- The Rhyme and Reason of Politics in Early Modern Europe: Collected Essays of Herbert Harvey Rowen, by Craig E. Harline, 1992
- The World of William and Mary: Anglo-Dutch Perspectives on the Revolution of 1688–89, edited by Dale Hoak, 1996
