= Andrew H. Schapiro =

American attorney and diplomat (born 1963)

Andrew Schapiro
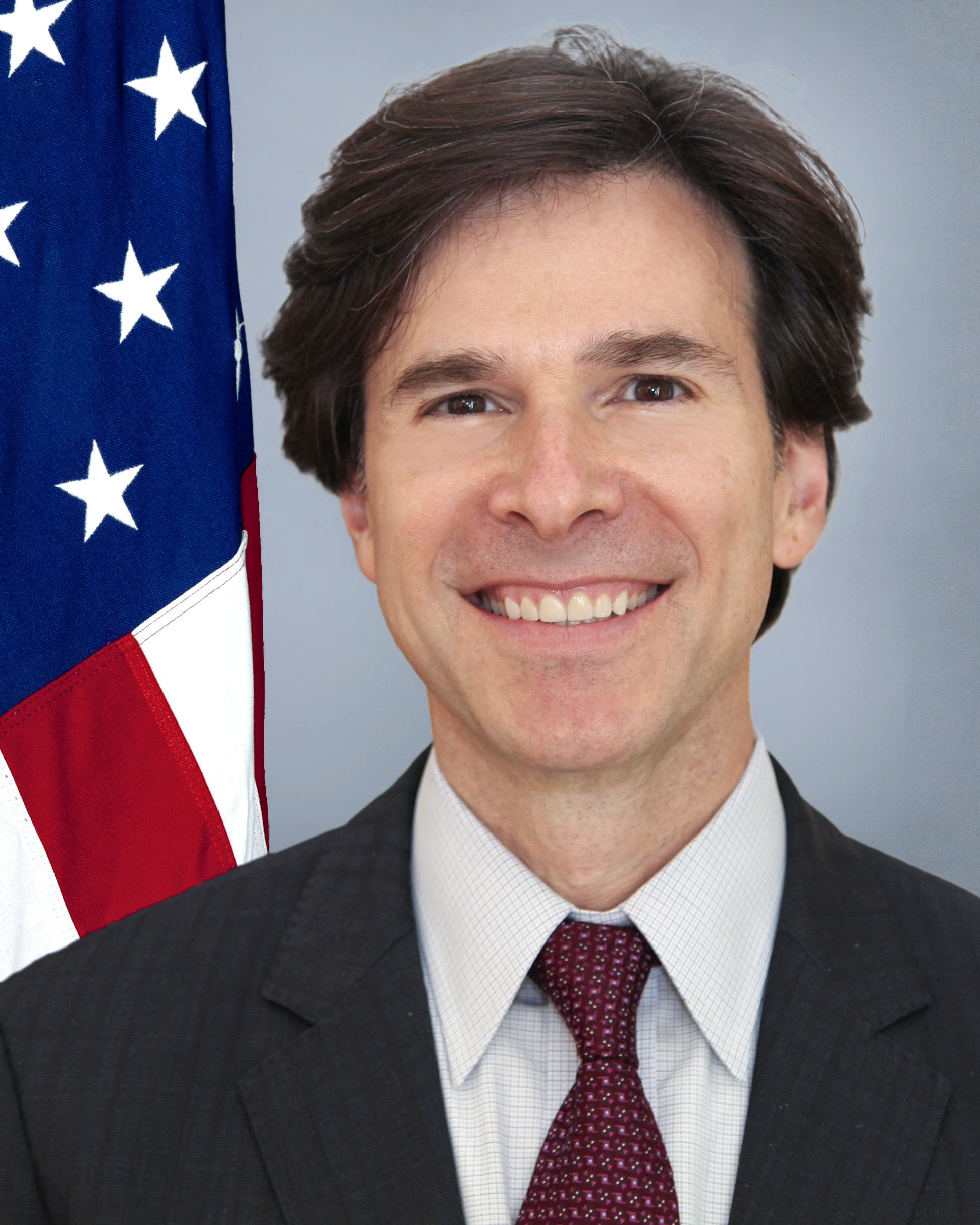
- Official portrait, 2014

8th United States Ambassador to the Czech Republic
- In office September 30, 2014 – January 20, 2017
- President: Barack Obama
- Preceded by: Norm Eisen
- Succeeded by: Steve King

Personal details
- Born: April 25, 1963 (age 63) Chicago, Illinois, U.S.
- Party: Democratic
- Spouse: Tamar Newberger
- Children: 2
- Education: Yale University (BA); Merton College, Oxford (MA); Harvard University (JD)

Andrew H. Schapiro (born April 25, 1963) is an American attorney and diplomat who served as United States Ambassador to the Czech Republic from September 30, 2014, to January 20, 2017. He was nominated by President Barack Obama March 6, 2014 and confirmed by the Senate in July 2014. He was sworn in on August 14, 2014, and presented his credentials to President Miloš Zeman on September 30, 2014. He is currently a partner of Quinn Emanuel Urquhart & Sullivan.

== Early life and education ==
Schapiro grew up in the Chicago metropolitan area, the son of Raya Czerner Schapiro and Joseph Schapiro. His mother, a Czech immigrant who was born in Prague, was a psychiatrist and Holocaust refugee. His father was a pediatrician.

Schapiro graduated from Homewood-Flossmoor High School in 1981. He attended Yale University, graduating with a B.A. in history magna cum laude in 1985. Schapiro then attended the Merton College, Oxford on a Marshall Scholarship, earning a B.A. (later promoted to an M.A.) in philosophy, politics and economics, with first-class honors, in 1987. He then entered Harvard Law School, where he served on the Law Review with Barack Obama. Schapiro was awarded a J.D. degree in 1990.

== Legal career ==
Schapiro served as a law clerk for Judge Richard Posner of the United States Court of Appeals for the Seventh Circuit in Chicago, and then clerked for U.S. Supreme Court Justice Harry Blackmun, in Washington, DC. Schapiro is credited with helping to shape Blackmun's eventual position as a death penalty "abolitionist". Schapiro wrote to the justice, "Efforts to fine-tune the machinery of death cannot succeed".

Following his clerkships, Schapiro spent five years as a public-interest lawyer in the office of the Federal Public Defender in New York City, defending individuals charged with federal crimes who could not afford to hire their own attorneys. As a partner at two global law firms—first Mayer Brown and then Quinn Emanuel Urquhart & Sullivan—he specialized in intellectual property and commercial litigation and appeals. Following diplomatic service, he returned to Quinn Emanuel Urquhart & Sullivan, again as a partner.

He has been ranked in Best Lawyers In America and Legal 500 USA, and was twice chosen as the American Lawyer's "Litigator of the Week" for landmark victories on behalf of YouTube and Google in the $1 billion Viacom v. YouTube litigation. He has been described in the press as a "superstar" and "one of the brightest legal minds of his generation".

== Ambassadorship ==
On March 6, 2014, President Obama nominated Schapiro to be U.S. Ambassador to the Czech Republic. He was confirmed by the U.S. Senate by a voice vote on July 23, 2014. In his first year as ambassador, he visited each of the country's 14 regions. Schapiro's 2015 appearance on the popular Jan Kraus talk show drew notice after he sang and played "Jumpin' Jack Flash", by The Rolling Stones, with the house band, at the host's invitation.

In April 2015, Schapiro suggested in a television interview that it could be "awkward" for Czech President Milos Zeman to go ahead with plans to attend a military parade in Moscow, which other Western leaders were avoiding due to the Russo-Ukrainian war and where Zeman was expected to be the only European head of state on the reviewing stand. President Zeman responded by condemning Schapiro for his comments. Zeman's reaction drew criticism from across the Czech political spectrum, and Zeman then decided not to attend the parade.

Schapiro has emphasized the importance of a strong NATO partnership, and in 2015 traveled to Afghanistan with Czech military commanders to visit Czech and American troops serving together at Bagram Air Base. During Schapiro's tenure as ambassador, the US Embassy increased its focus on innovation and entrepreneurship, and initiated a new Ambassador's Fund for Women's Empowerment to assist Czech groups working to deepen the participation of women in business, government and public life.

== Civic and political activity ==
Schapiro has served on the board of directors of the Chicago Low-Income Housing Trust Fund, the Criminal Justice Act Advisory Board of the U.S. Court of Appeals for the Second Circuit, the Board of Directors of the Jewish Council on Urban Affairs, and the advisory board of the institute on the Supreme Court of the United States. He was a member of the Democratic National Committee's 2012 Platform Committee as well as its National Finance Committee.

== Personal ==
Schapiro is married to Tamar Newberger, and they have two children, Galia and Alex.

== See also ==
- List of law clerks for the second seat of the Supreme Court of the United States

Diplomatic posts
Preceded by Norm Eisen	United States Ambassador to the Czech Republic; 2014–2017	Succeeded by Steve King
