= Jenonne R. Walker =

American diplomat

2nd United States Ambassador to the Czech Republic
- In office June 27, 1995 – August 31, 1998
- President: Bill Clinton
- Preceded by: Adrian A. Basora
- Succeeded by: John Shattuck

Personal details
- Born: 1934 (age 91–92)

Jenonne R. Walker (born 1934) was appointed U.S. Ambassador to the Czech Republic on June 27, 1995, by President Clinton. She presented her credentials on August 31, 1995, and left her post three years later, on August 31, 1998.

She served in various posts in the U.S. Department of State, including that of political counselor at the U.S. Embassy in Sweden from 1981 to 1983, and was on the National Security Council during the Carter Administration.

== Education ==
Jenonne R. Walker was raised in Oklahoma. She studied at the University of Oklahoma where she received a Bachelor's degree in Letters and a Master of Arts in Philosophy. She did also study contemporary literature and philosophy at the Sorbonne in Paris and at the University of London.

== Career ==
Walker started her government career as an analyst of West European affairs at the CIA. She was also a member of the Policy Planning Staff at the Department of State. In 1983 she worked as Political Counsler at the U.S. Embassy in Sweden. From 1984-1990 she held various positions in the State Department and helped to shape the policy of the United States on arms control negotiations through her work as Chair of various interinstitutional committees.

From 1993 to 1994 Walker has been Senior Director for Europe on the National Security Council Staff where she has been the Presidents expert on U.S. relations with Europe. She was also Special Assistant to President Clinton.

== Publications ==
- Keeping America in Europe, Foreign Policy, Summer 1991.

Diplomatic posts
| Preceded by Adrian A. Basora | United States Ambassador to the Czech Republic; 1995–1998 | Succeeded by John Shattuck |
