= Bijan Sabet =

American venture capitalist and diplomat

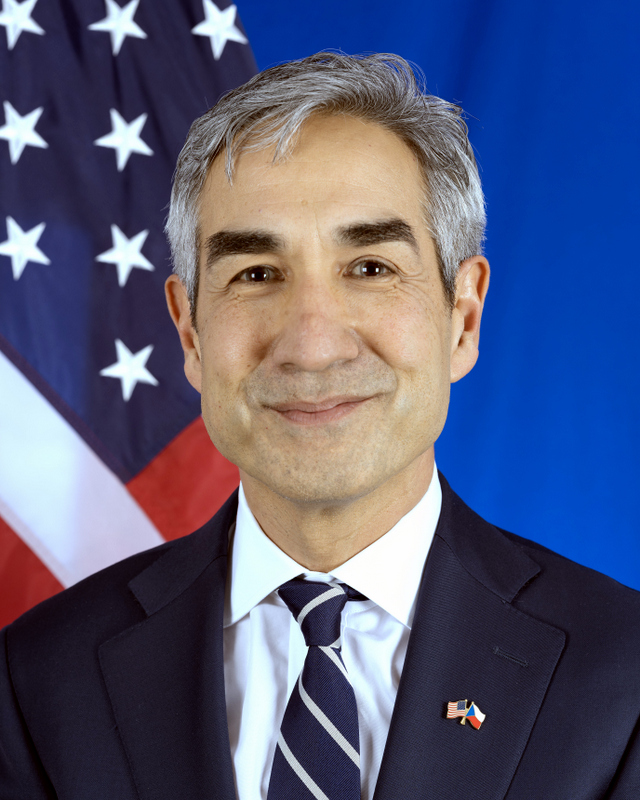

United States Ambassador to the Czech Republic
- In office February 15, 2023 – January 20, 2025
- President: Joe Biden
- Preceded by: Stephen B. King
- Succeeded by: Nicholas Merrick

Personal details
- Education: Boston College (BS)

Bijan Sabet is an American venture capitalist who had served as the United States ambassador to the Czech Republic.

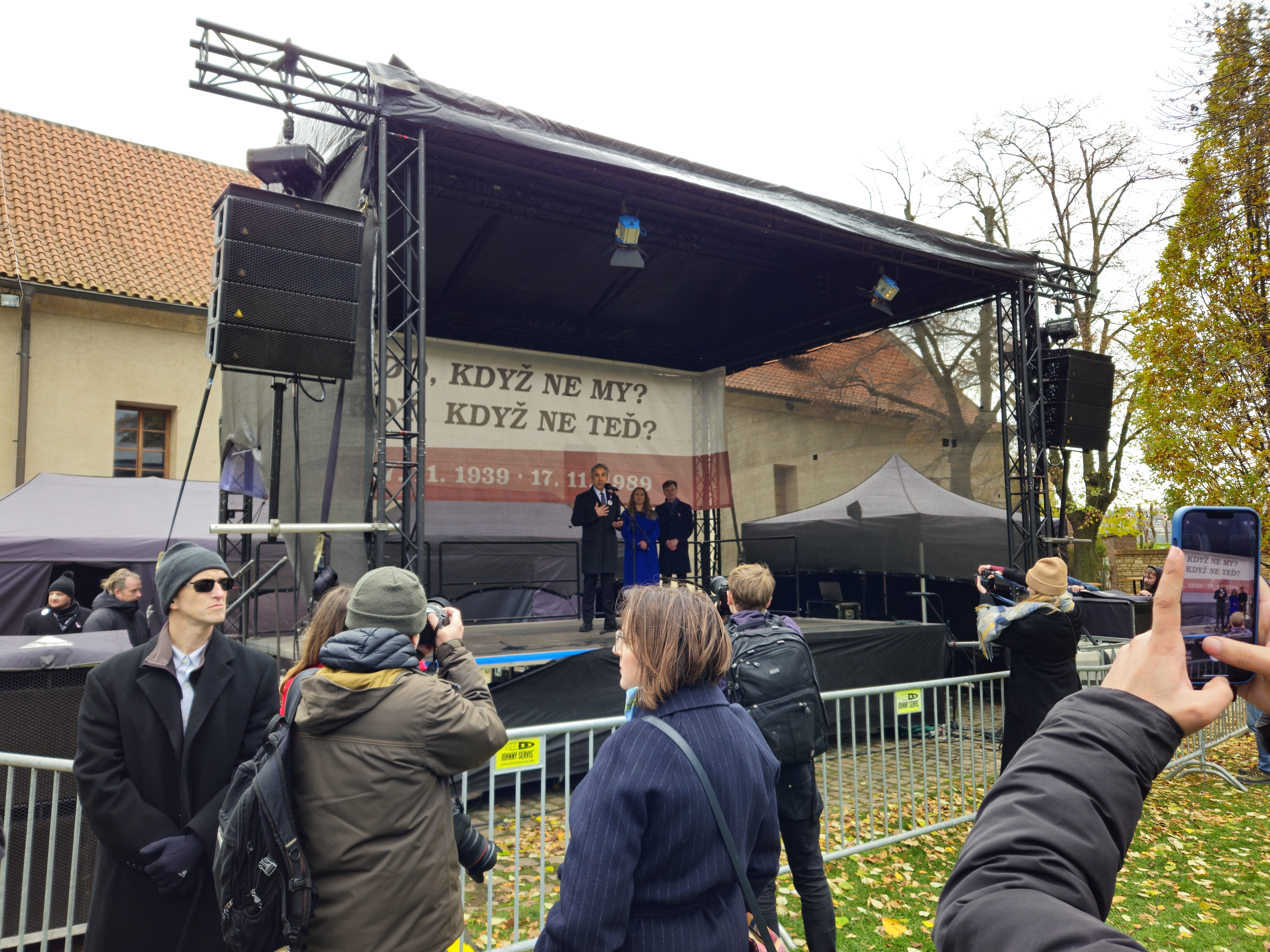
Ambassador Bijan Sabet at the Vyšehrad Burgrave's House, during the commemorative event organized on the occasion of the 35th anniversary of the Velvet Revolution (17.11.2024).

== Education ==
Sabet's mother immigrated from Korea in the 1960s, his father immigrated from Iran at the same time. Sabet earned a bachelor's degree from Boston College.

== Career ==
Sabet co-founded Spark Capital in 2005, a venture capital firm that focuses on entrepreneurs and their designs; he currently serves as General Partner. It handles billion of dollars spanning venture and venture growth funds. In his role at Spark Capital, Sabet has led investments and served on the board of directors of early-stage startup companies that have transformed into global leaders. Sabet worked as a senior executive in numerous technology startup companies in Silicon Valley, California, and Massachusetts. Sabet helped lead early investments in other companies, such as Wayfair, Cruise Automotive, Oculus, Slack, Tumblr, Warby Parker, Discord, Stack Overflow, etc.

Sabet serves on the boards of two independent schools; while his wife Lauren is on the Board of Regents of Boston College.

=== United States ambassador to the Czech Republic ===
On August 3, 2022, President Joe Biden nominated Sabet to serve as the United States ambassador to the Czech Republic. Hearings on his nomination were held before the Senate Foreign Relations Committee on November 29, 2022. On December 7, 2022, the committee favorably reported his nomination to the Senate. On December 13, 2022, his nomination was confirmed by the Senate by voice vote. He was sworn in on December 16, 2022, and presented his credentials to President Miloš Zeman on February 15, 2023.

== See also ==
- Ambassadors of the United States

Diplomatic posts
Preceded by Christy Agor; Charge d'Affaires	United States Ambassador to the Czech Republic; 2023–2025	Succeeded by Nicholas Merrick
