= Joseph Popolo Jr. =

US Ambassador to the Netherlands

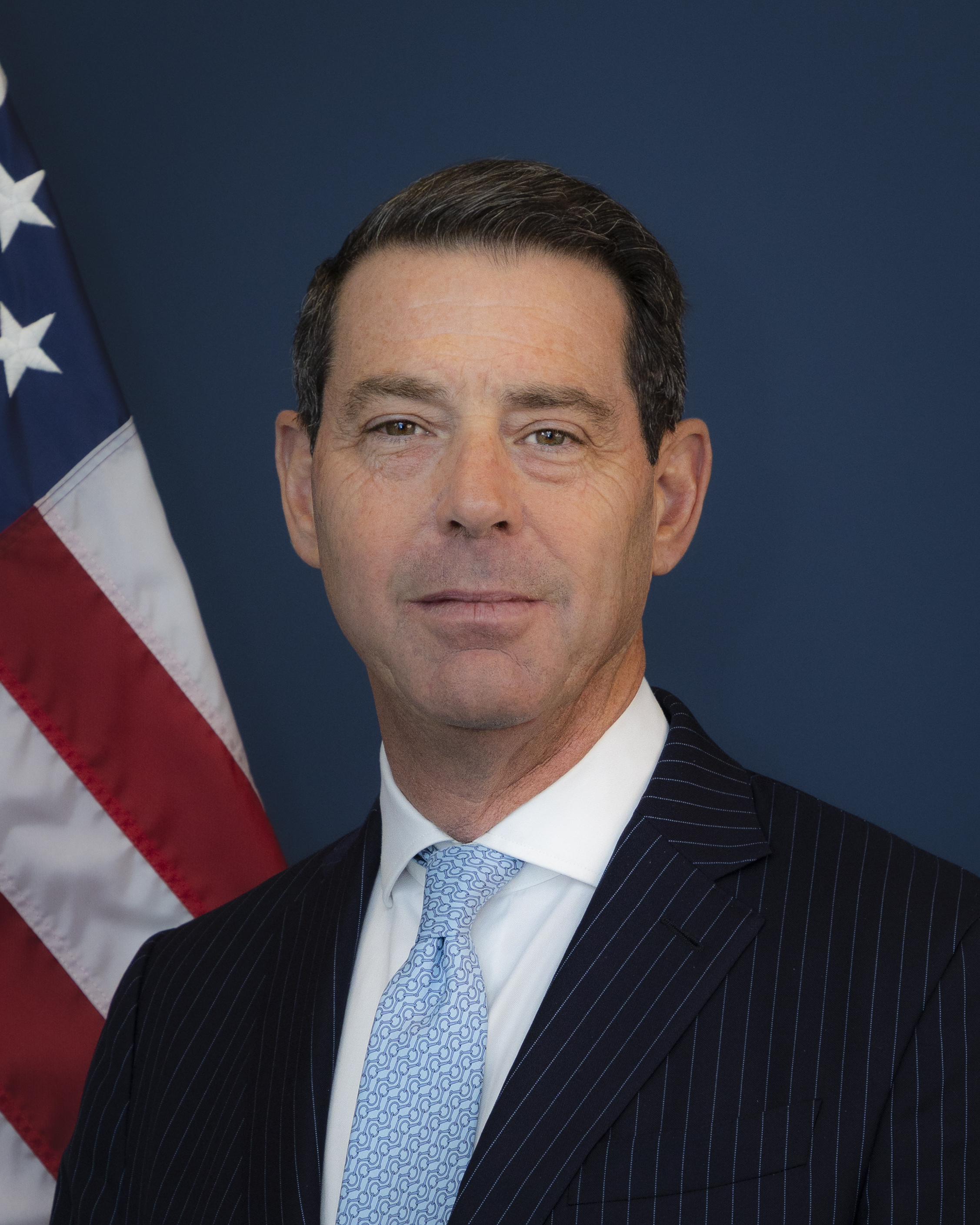

United States Ambassador to the Netherlands
- Incumbent
- Assumed office October 28, 2025
- President: Donald Trump
- Preceded by: Shefali Razdan Duggal

Personal details
- Education: Boston College (BS); University of Chicago (MBA)

Joseph Popolo Jr. is the current United States Ambassador to the Kingdom of the Netherlands, a businessman, investor, and political donor. Popolo is best known for his leadership at Freeman Company, a global provider of event marketing services, where he served as president from 2001 to 2008 and as CEO from 2008 to 2019. During his tenure, he oversaw the company’s international expansion and led it through substantial revenue growth.

Following his time at Freeman, Popolo founded Charles & Potomac Capital, a Dallas-based private investment firm. He has served on multiple corporate boards, including Ondas Holdings (NASDAQ: ONDS) and Pinnacle Live, and held advisory roles with various firms in technology, media, and finance. He has also been actively involved in education and philanthropy, serving on the boards of Boston College and the Cox School of Business at Southern Methodist University.

A long-time Republican supporter, Popolo has contributed millions of dollars to party candidates and causes, including significant donations to Donald Trump’s presidential campaigns. His nomination to the ambassadorship included a confirmation process before the U.S. Senate, where he identified trade, security cooperation, and emerging technologies as key priorities.

== Education and early career ==
Joseph Popolo earned a degree in finance from Boston College in 1989 and an MBA in finance and economics from the University of Chicago Booth School of Business in 1997, where he received a Dean’s Award of Distinction.

Early in his career, Popolo completed an unpaid internship with a local representative in Washington, D.C. He later worked for a national trade association representing the trucking industry and ran state government lobbying for Roadway Services. Although initially interested in politics, he eventually chose to pursue a business career.

== Ambassadorship ==
Popolo was nominated by President-elect Donald Trump to serve as the U.S. Ambassador to the Kingdom of the Netherlands. The appointment was announced on January 3, 2025, through Trump’s social media platform, Truth Social. In October 2025, he was confirmed by the U.S. Senate to the position.

Popolo was offered several countries by the Trump transition team and chose the ambassadorship to the Netherlands. He has previously traveled to the country through business connections, as Freeman’s European operations were consolidated into a company based there. He has described the Netherlands as a strong ally and an important national security partner.

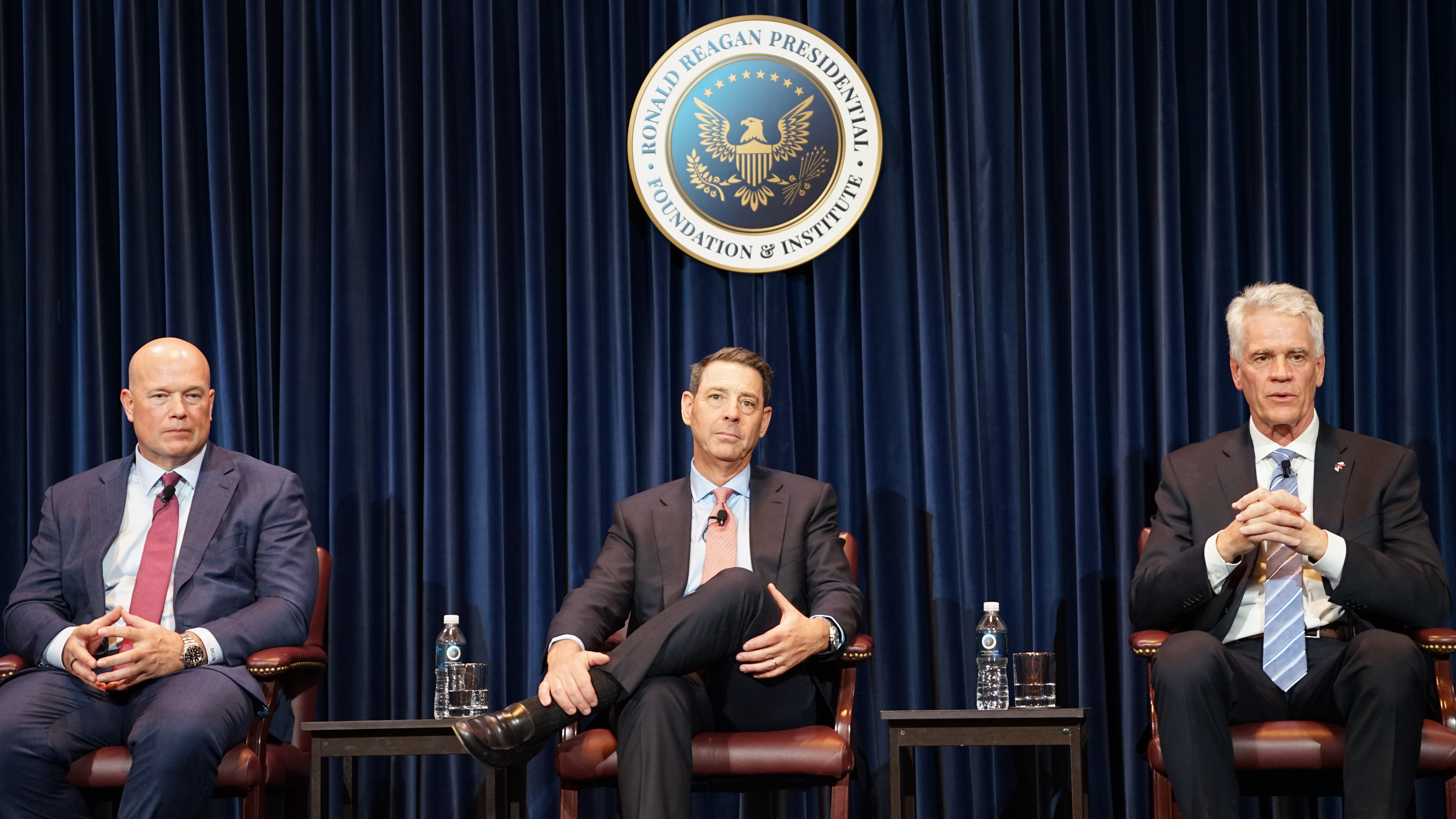
Matthew Whitaker, Popolo, Nicholas Merrick at Reagan Library

The U.S. Senate received Popolo’s nomination on March 24, 2025, and referred it to the Committee on Foreign Relations. A hearing was held on May 1 and the committee reported the nomination favorably on May 8. That same day, the nomination was placed on the Senate Executive Calendar. Popolo succeeded Shefali Razdan Duggal.

Popolo has identified several priorities for his potential ambassadorship, including strengthening U.S.-Netherlands trade relations and promoting Dutch contributions to U.S. national security goals, such as meeting NATO’s 2% percent of GDP defense spending target and supporting a proposed 5% benchmark. He plans to focus on cooperation in critical and emerging technologies, including artificial intelligence and semiconductor equipment manufacturing.

He has stated that he intends to serve in a bipartisan manner, with an emphasis on the safety and wellbeing of U.S. citizens in the Netherlands. If confirmed, he would be required to reside in the Netherlands, oversee approximately 400 State Department employees, disclose any potential conflicts of interest to the Office of Government Ethics, and may be required to divest from certain business holdings.

After being confirmed, he voiced his support of the removal of panels honoring African-American World War II soldiers at the Netherlands American Cemetery, accusing them of promoting "an agenda that criticizes America".

== Business career ==
Popolo had a long career at Freeman Company, serving as president from 2001 to 2008 and as chief executive officer from 2008 to 2019. He became CEO in 2008, when the company was nearly 100 years old and a major contractor in the exhibition industry.

Freeman Company, founded in the 1920s by Buck Freeman in Iowa, is a family-owned global provider of event marketing services. The company is known for its work in live event brand experiences and has maintained a small-company atmosphere with a culture of family and employee ownership.

While at the company, Popolo oversaw the firm’s expansion into international markets and led a significant increase in annual revenue, growing it from $700 million in 2001 to $3 billion. Under his leadership, Freeman became a global leader in live event brand experiences. He managed a team of approximately 7,500 employees across 25 cities on four continents.

Popolo also directed more than $1.5 billion in mergers and acquisitions, including the sale of Freeman’s Encore Event Technology subsidiary to Blackstone in 2018–2019.

Popolo views entrepreneurship as a "state of mind" that can exist even within large companies. He openly admitted that during Freeman's global expansion, "we stubbed our toes and made every mistake most entrepreneurs do."

Popolo was offered the role of co-chair of the firm, but decided to step down as CEO in 2019 after more than 20 years with the firm. In 2022 with a group of former Freeman and Encore employees, Popolo co-founded Pinnacle Live, a US-based event technology firm. Popolo reportedly walked away from a $20 million deferred compensation pay out to start Pinnacle Live.

After leaving Freeman, Popolo founded Charles & Potomac Capital, LLC, a private investment firm based in Dallas. He served as the firm’s CEO from 2019 to 2025. The company focuses on private equity and venture capital investments across sectors such as technology, healthcare, media, energy, and real estate, and also engages in direct investments and advisory services for selected businesses.

== Boards ==
Popolo served as chairman of the board of Pinnacle Live, LLC from August 2021 to May 2025.

He served as a board member of Ondas Holdings, Inc. from April 2023 to May 2025 and was appointed as an independent director in 2024. Through C&P he began investing in Ondas Holdings in 2020 and led an investor group that acquired a significant stake in its subsidiary, Ondas Networks Inc. By 2024, he held approximately 19% beneficial ownership of Ondas Holdings and was also appointed to the board of Ondas Networks, Inc.

Ondas Holdings acquired Airobotics Ltd, an Israeli company that develops autonomous counter-drone systems. By late 2024, Airobotics had received military contracts totaling $14.4 million from a major military client.

Popolo served on the advisory boards of the Jordan Edmiston Group, Samesurf, and Advisory Research.

Popolo has acknowledged that his board position at Ondas Holdings, whose subsidiary is involved in counter-drone systems used by an Israeli defense company, could present a potential conflict of interest if he becomes U.S. Ambassador to the Netherlands, home to the International Criminal Court. He has stated that he will seek guidance from the Office of Government Ethics regarding the matter.

== Philanthropy and education ==
Popolo is active in philanthropy and education. He joined the Boston College Board of Trustees in June 2023, having previously served on the university’s Board of Regents. He and his wife have supported a range of initiatives at Boston College, including scholarships and endowments. Their contributions include the establishment of the Popolo Family Executive Directorship at the Edmund H. Shea Jr. Center for Entrepreneurship, as well as the Popolo Family Running Back Football Scholarship, and endowed the Edward Connelly Offensive Coordinator position in 2025 in honor of his maternal grandfather.

Popolo and his wife, Chris, serve on the executive committee of Soaring Higher, Boston College’s $3 billion fundraising campaign. He also serves on the executive board of the Cox School of Business at Southern Methodist University. In addition, he co-founded and is a director of the HALO Initiative for Catholic Education in Dallas.

In 2022, Popolo co-founded Friends of the Heights, the official Name, Image, and Likeness (NIL) collective for student-athletes at Boston College.

Popolo has expressed a strong interest in improving education outcomes, assisting those in need, and supporting charitable organizations that reflect his faith. He believes that entrepreneurs play a key role in driving progress across various fields.

Beyond his business and diplomatic pursuits, Popolo expressed a desire to eventually pursue philanthropy full-time. He and his wife believe they are "called to serve" and are passionate about improving education outcomes, helping people get back on their feet, and supporting organizations aligned with their respective faiths.

== Political activities ==
Popolo has been described as a Republican power broker and major donor. He began regularly contributing to the Republican Party in 2003, citing gratitude and his Catholic faith as motivations. He has stated that his beliefs align with principles such as political and economic freedom and limited government.

Popolo supported Donald Trump during the 2016 and 2020 presidential elections. In 2016, his direct contribution to the Trump Victory PAC was modest, but he gave over $141,300 to various Republican candidates and organizations during that election cycle. In 2020, he increased his political contributions, donating more than $1 million in total to Trump’s campaign, Republican candidates, political action committees, and Super PACs.

During the 2024 election cycle Popolo had donated $827,900 to the Trump campaign, nearly matching his contributions from the 2020 cycle. His total donations to Republican candidates and organizations during the 2024 cycle amounted to $2,971,408.87.

Popolo has also contributed to organizations that support education savings accounts and school choice initiatives.

== Awards and recognition ==
Popolo has received several awards recognizing his leadership and contributions. He is a recipient of the Ernst & Young Entrepreneur of the Year Award. In May 2018, he received the Dallas Business Journal’s Most Admired CEO Award for his work at Freeman Company. That same year, he was awarde the John P. Curley 1913 Award from Boston College for his volunteer efforts and support of BC Athletics. In 2024, he received the Governor William P. Clements, Jr. Award from the Dallas Entrepreneurial PAC.

== Personal and family ==
Popolo is married to Christine Freeman Popolo, the daughter of Donald S. Freeman Jr., who served as chairman of Freeman Company until 2019. Christine has also served on the company’s board of directors. Popolo has joked that marrying the chairman’s daughter positively influenced his career path. Popolo is a practicing catholic.

Popolo’s family has longstanding connections to Boston College. His ties to the university extend beyond his role as a trustee. His maternal grandfather, Edward F. Connelly, was accepted to play football at the university in 1929 but was unable to attend due to family circumstances. Two of Connelly’s children, Helen (Class of 1967) and Edward Jr. (Class of 1972), did attend. Popolo’s father, Joseph V. Popolo Sr., received an MBA from Boston College in 1967. Popolo has credited his early interest in entrepreneurship to observing his parents build their computer software business.

Popolo and his wife, Christine, have three children. Their daughter graduated from the Carroll School of Management (CSOM) in 2020, and their youngest son graduated from the CSOM in 2025.

== See also ==
- Ambassador
- Boston College
- List of ambassadors of the United States to the Netherlands
- The Netherlands
- U.S. Department of State

Diplomatic posts
| Preceded by Shefali Razdan Duggal | United States Ambassador to the Netherlands; 2025–present | Incumbent |
