= Adrian A. Basora =

American diplomat (born 1938)

1st United States Ambassador to the Czech Republic
- In office January 1, 1993 – July 15, 1995
- President: George H. W. Bush; Bill Clinton
- Preceded by: Diplomatic relations established
- Succeeded by: Jenonne R. Walker

28th United States Ambassador to Czechoslovakia
- In office July 20, 1992 – December 31, 1992
- President: George H. W. Bush
- Preceded by: Shirley Temple Black
- Succeeded by: Diplomatic relations terminated

Personal details
- Born: July 18, 1938 (age 88) New York City, New York, U.S.
- Spouse: Pauline Barnes
- Education: Fordham University (AB); Princeton University (MPA)

Adrian Anthony Basora (born July 18, 1938) is an American diplomat, and former United States Ambassador to the Czech Republic. He is a senior fellow at the Foreign Policy Research Institute researching democratization in the post-Communist states of Europe and Central Asia, and a member of the Council on Foreign Relations.

Basora graduated with an AB from Fordham University in 1960 and a CEP (a Certificate of Political Studies) at Sciences Po in 1962, and later earned an MPA at Princeton University.

== Diplomatic career ==
Basora was a career diplomat in the United States Foreign Service. He spent his early career doing political and economic work in Peru and Paraguay, and press and cultural work in Romania. He served as Deputy Treasury Representative and then U.S. Commercial Attaché to France 1976–1980, where he engaged the French on various financial and economic issues, and counseled and advocated for U.S. firms. He was appointed Director of Development Finance in 1980, where he represented the State Department in various multilateral financial institutions. He returned to Paris in 1983 as U.S. Political Counselor. In 1986 he was appointed Deputy Chief of Mission at the U.S. Embassy in Madrid. While in that role he served as Deputy Negotiator in U.S.-Spanish base agreement talks addressing post-Franco frictions.

In 1989, Basora joined the White House staff as Director for European Affairs on the National Security Council, participating in reshaping U.S. policy after the fall of the Berlin Wall. He organized a high-level presidential mission to Poland to highlight U.S. support for post-Communist governments in Eastern Europe and helped design and launch U.S. and multilateral assistance programs to fund rapid economic transformation of former Soviet Bloc states.

=== Ambassadorship ===
After a brief stint as a research associate at the Center for the Study of Foreign Affairs at the Foreign Service Institute, he was selected as U.S. Ambassador to Czechoslovakia on May 1, 1992, by President George H. W. Bush. He was formally appointed on June 15 of that year and presented his credentials on July 20. In the meantime, on June 1, the "Velvet Divorce" (dissolution of Czechoslovakia) had been announced, to take effect January 1, 1993, after which he continued as chief of mission in Prague and Ambassador to the Czech Republic.

Basora oversaw implementation of a $65 million U.S. assistance program to facilitate the opening of Czech civil society as well as privatization and other market reforms. The Czech Republic became the first post-Communist European country to "graduate" from U.S. assistance, which he attributes to this "jump start". Basora also advocated for U.S. firms investing in the country, including the first American acquisition of a TV station in the region. He left the post on July 15, 1995.

== Later career ==
From June 1996 to August 2004 he served as president of the Eisenhower Fellowships, a Philadelphia-based organization that supports networking between potential leaders in the United States and those in other countries. He continues to serve as past president and a trustee, and as a trustee of the International Research and Exchanges Board (IREX), which conducts academic and leadership exchanges between the U.S. and certain post-Communist countries.

He led the Project on Democratic Transitions of the Foreign Policy Research Institute as its director from its launch in January 2005. The Project was a two-year assessment of the economic, political, and social changes in Central and Eastern Europe since the fall of communism, to see if lessons learned could improve reforms in Russia and other countries. In 2006, he published an article identifying 19 of the 28 former communist countries as "successful" transitions with a number of similarities He has since written more pessimistically about the progress of democratization in the former Soviet bloc, however, and urged stronger U.S. interest In 2008 he wrote: "Long before the Russians entered Georgia, democracy was clearly on the retreat in postcommunist Europe and Eurasia, as was the leverage of both the United States and the democratic European powers." Basora is on the international advisory board of the Auschwitz Institute and an independent director of the Quaker Investment Trust.

== Personal life ==
A resident of New Hampshire, he is married to Pauline Barnes, a writer, and has one daughter. He is fluent in French and Spanish and has basic knowledge of Czech, Romanian and Italian.

== See also ==
- History of the United States National Security Council 1989–1992

Diplomatic posts
Preceded by Shirley Temple Black	U.S. Ambassador to Czechoslovakia; 1992	Succeeded by Office abolished The dissolution of Czechoslovakia became effective January 1, 1993.
Preceded by New creation	U.S. Ambassador to the Czech Republic; 1993–1995	Succeeded by Jenonne R. Walker
