= Stephen B. King =

American diplomat and activist (born 1941)

Steve King
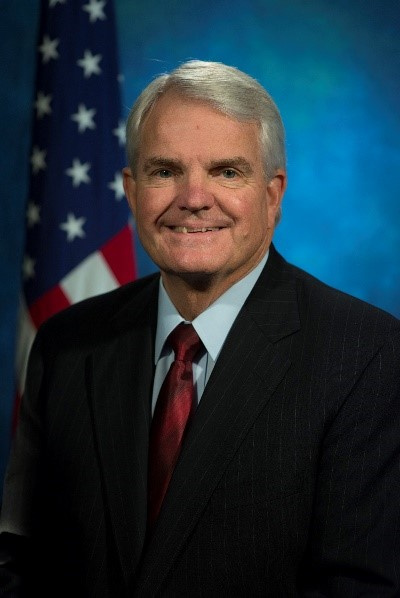

United States Ambassador to the Czech Republic
- In office December 6, 2017 – January 20, 2021
- President: Donald Trump
- Preceded by: Andrew H. Schapiro
- Succeeded by: Bijan Sabet

Personal details
- Born: July 4, 1941 (age 85) Indianapolis, Indiana, U.S.
- Party: Republican
- Education: Western Illinois University
- Occupation: Businessman

Stephen B. King (born July 4, 1941) is an American businessman and political activist who served as the United States Ambassador to the Czech Republic from 2017 to 2021. A member of the Republican Party, he is the founder of King Capital LLC, an equity investment and real estate company. He previously worked at the Federal Bureau of Investigation (FBI) as an agent and campaigned unsuccessfully in 1988 for his party's nomination for the U.S. Senate in Wisconsin. During the Nixon administration, while working for the Committee for the Re-Election of the President, King was involved in the kidnapping of Martha Mitchell, the wife of the then-Attorney General.

== Early life and education ==
King was born in Indianapolis, Indiana, and was raised in Chicago, Illinois. He received a Bachelor of Arts in social science in 1963 and a master's degree in political science in 1966 from Western Illinois University. He worked as a social science teacher in Rushville, Illinois, from 1963 to 1966 and then as Assistant to the Superintendent of Schools in the same school district until 1967.

== Career ==
King joined the Federal Bureau of Investigation in 1967. He investigated civil rights violations in Jackson, Mississippi, followed by racially motivated crimes, homicide, arson, bombing and bank robbery. Three times he received special commendations for excellent performance.

In 1970, King resigned to serve as legislative assistant to Republican Senator Edward Gurney of Florida. As Gurney's representative, he served on the staff of the Permanent Subcommittee on Investigations (PSI) of the U.S. Senate Committee on Government Operations, eventually becoming an investigator. In 1972, King was named Special Assistant to Earl Butz, the US Secretary of Agriculture.

In June 1972, at the time of the Watergate complex break-in, King was the security agent for the Committee for the Re-Election of the President assigned to abduct and hold Martha Mitchell, the wife of then United States Attorney General John N. Mitchell, in a hotel room in California, to prevent her from learning about the break-in. Mitchell contended that she had been held in her room against her will by King, during which time he used physical force to prevent her from speaking to the press and restrained her while she was injected with a sedative. The plot to hold Mrs. Mitchell was later confirmed by James McCord, one of the Watergate burglars. King has not denied his involvement in Mrs. Mitchell's confinement, but disputes parts of her story. In 2017, Sean Bartlett, a spokesman for the Democrats on the Senate Foreign Relations Committee, said King was asked about the incident involving Mitchell as part of his United States Senate confirmation process to be the next United States Ambassador to the Czech Republic. "After questioning him, and measuring his other qualifications and responses to questions on a range of issues, staff did not believe there was evidence or reason to delay his nomination," Bartlett said. King's appointment was approved by the Senate without objection in a voice vote.

In 1976, King became director of development at his alma mater, Western Illinois University. A year later he started his career as a businessman. He moved to Whitewater, Wisconsin, to serve as general manager of the woodworking firm Carlson's Miniatures. In 1979, he became a part owner and manager of Tomah Products, a chemical manufacturer. In 1994, King led a management buy-out of Tomah. Since then, he has served as president and CEO of Tomah Products, Inc.

He served as a delegate to Wisconsin Republican state conventions and the first congressional district Republican caucus from 1978. King was elected chairman of the Republican Party of Wisconsin in 1985. In 1988, King resigned to launch a campaign for the U.S. Senate. He lost the Republican nomination to Susan Engeleiter, who was defeated by Democrat Herb Kohl in the general election.

From 1990 to 2006, King served as president of the Milton Industrial and Economic Corporation. In 2006, King founded King Capital LLC, an equity investment and real estate company. In 2007, King was elected to represent Wisconsin on the Republican National Committee, and he served until 2017.

In July 2017, President Donald Trump nominated King to be the next United States Ambassador to the Czech Republic. This nomination was confirmed by the U.S. Senate on October 5, 2017.

King was the chief executive officer of the host committee for the 2024 Republican National Convention which was held in Milwaukee.

== Personal life ==
King and his wife Karen have three children.

Diplomatic posts
Preceded by Andrew H. Schapiro	United States Ambassador to the Czech Republic; 2017–2021	Succeeded by Jennifer Bachus; Chargé d´affaires
