= Embassy of the United States, Prague =

U.S. Embassy for the Czech Republic

Embassy of the United States, Prague Velvyslanectví Spojených států Amerických Praha
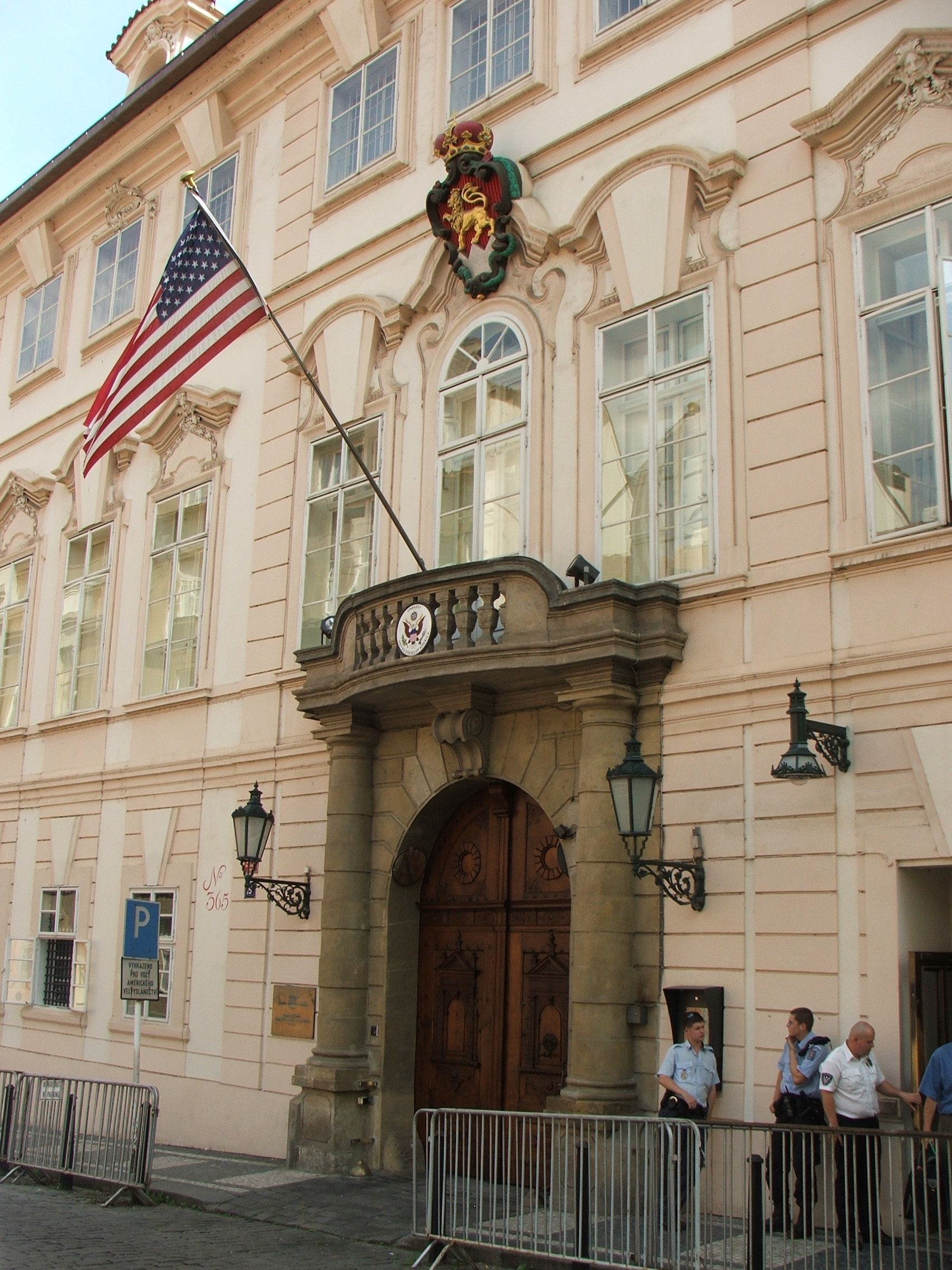
- Location: Malá Strana, Prague
- Address: Tržiště 15; 118 01 Praha 1 - Malá Strana
- Coordinates: 50°5′13.47″N 14°24′4.08″E
- Ambassador: Nicholas Merrick
- Website: https://cz.usembassy.gov

The Embassy of the United States of America in Prague (Czech: Velvyslanectví Spojených států amerických v Praze) is the diplomatic mission of the United States of America in the Czech Republic. The chancery is located on Vlašská street in Malá Strana, Prague, where it occupies the historic Schönborn Palace and possesses an extensive garden.

The premises also include the American Center, a public research facility, library, and venue for lectures on American history, politics, science, and culture.

== History ==
=== World War II ===
By concurrent decrees of the German and Czechoslovak governments, Czechoslovakia was dissolved on March 16, 1939, with the Czech lands becoming a protectorate of Germany, and Slovakia becoming an independent state. The next day, ambassador Wilbur J. Carr telegrammed the United States Department of State that "there are no officials of the Czechoslovak government, to which I am accredited with, whom I can maintain for protection of the interests of the United States and its citizens". Three days later, acting on orders of the United States government, the United States embassy in Prague terminated its mission. The legation and other property of the embassy was, thereafter, transferred to the Consulate-General of the United States in Prague and ambassador Carr returned to the United States. The Consulate-General itself was moved under the jurisdiction of the Embassy of the United States, Berlin.

=== Present day ===
The Czech Republic, previously part of Czechoslovakia, was established on January 1, 1993, following what is commonly known as the Velvet Divorce. The United States recognized the new Czech state immediately and reiterated its intention to foster full and productive relations with Czech Republic.

== Gallery ==
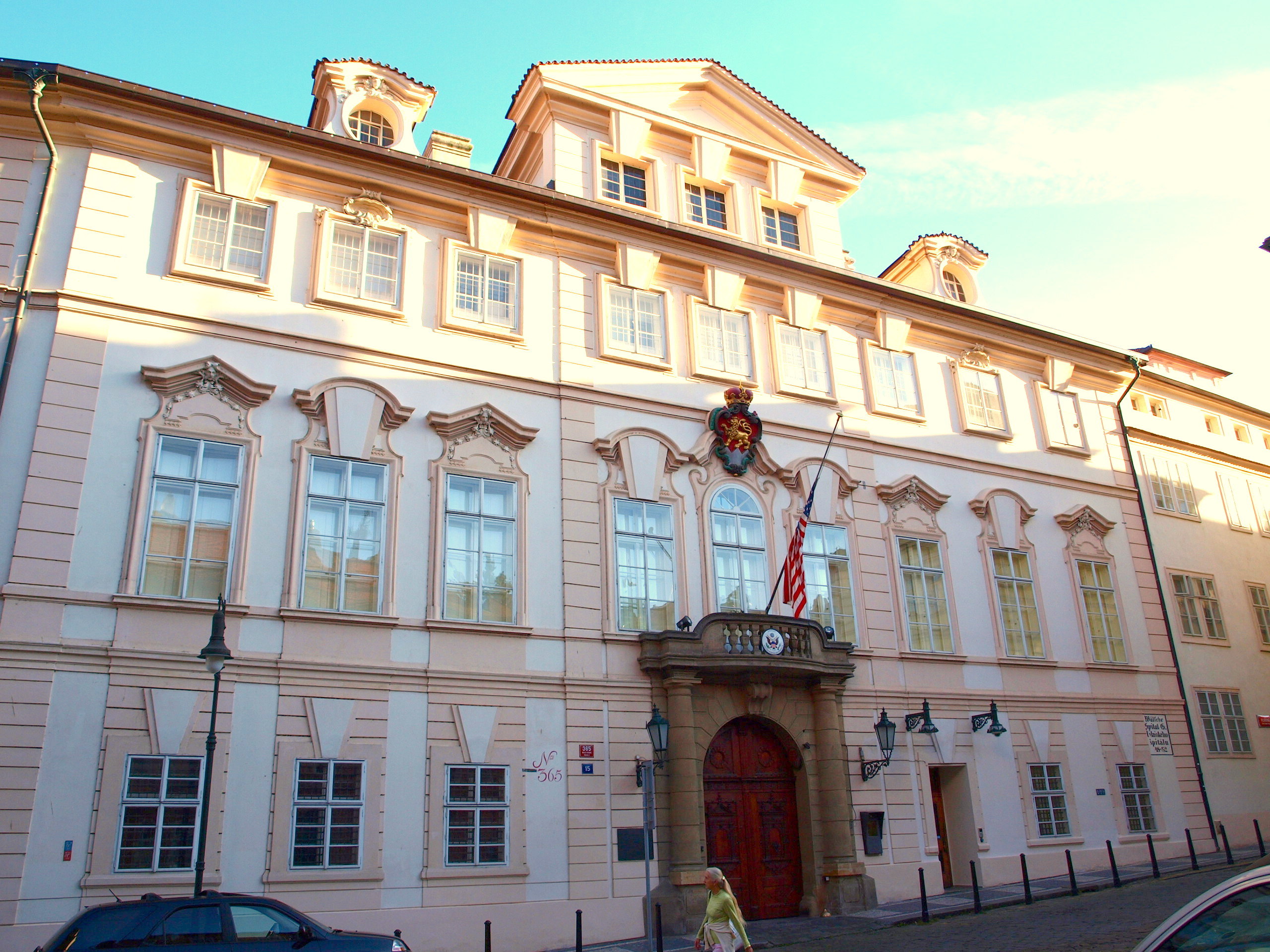
The embassy in 2012

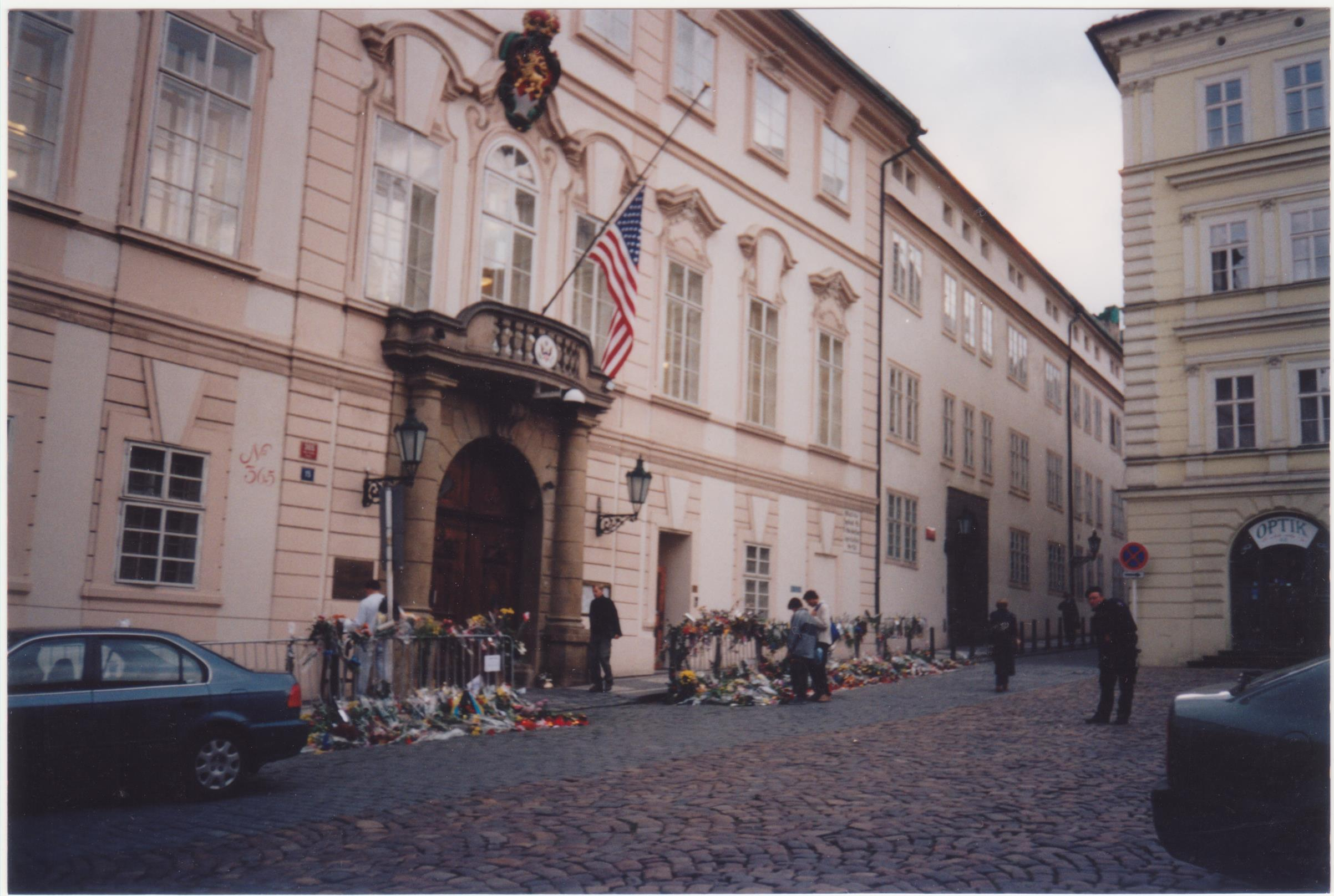
The embassy after the 9/11 terror attacks

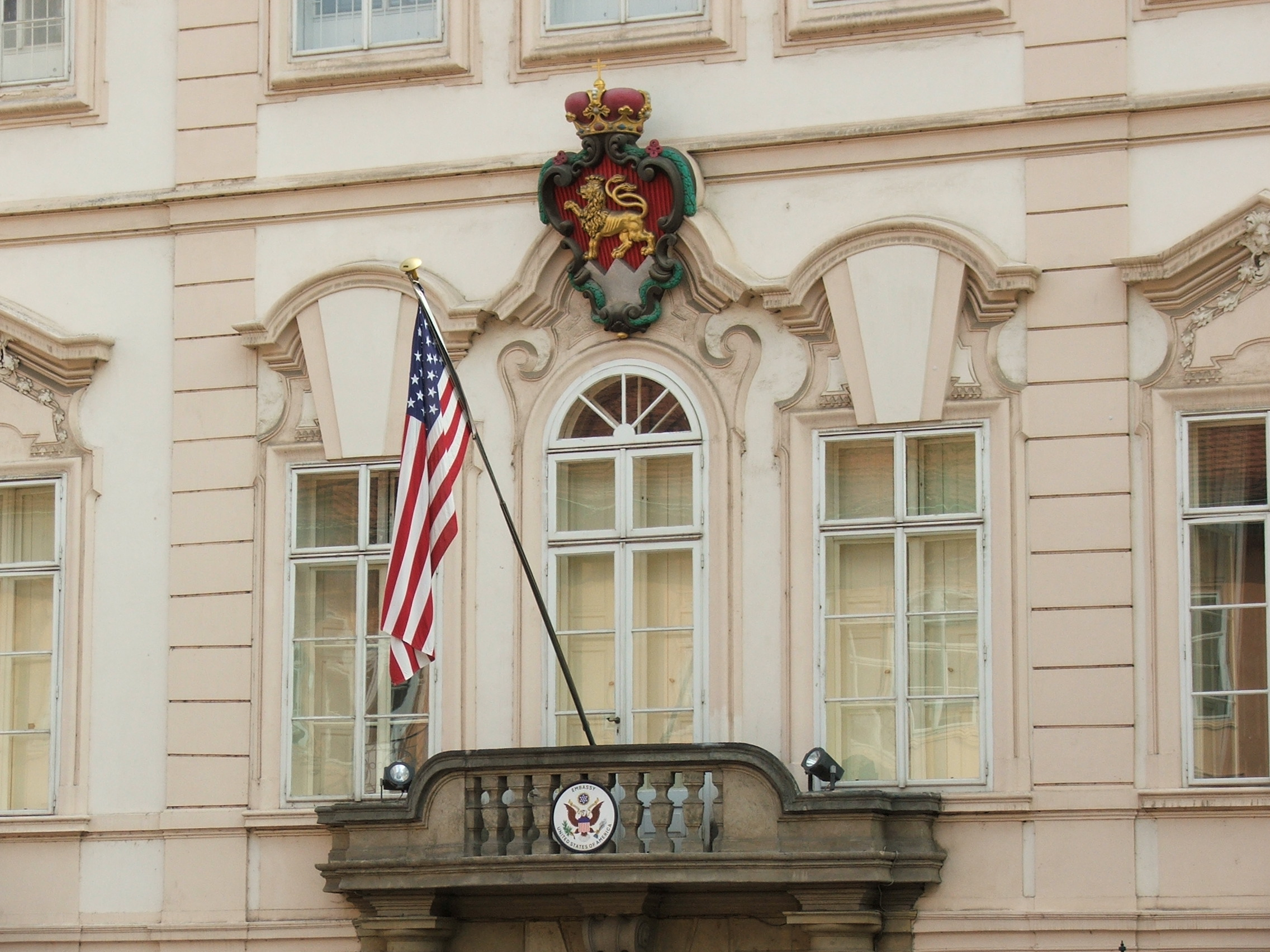
Flag over the front entrance

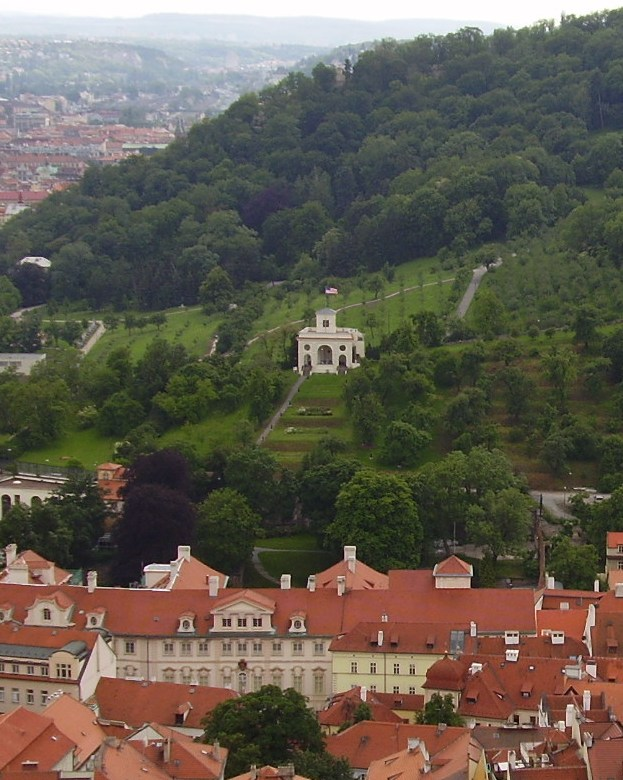
The garden visible on Petřín Hill

== See also ==
- United States Ambassador to the Czech Republic
- United States Ambassador to Czechoslovakia
