= The Holocaust in Czechoslovakia =

During World War II, Czechoslovakia was divided into four different regions, each administered by a different authority: Sudetenland (Germany), Protectorate of Bohemia and Moravia, the Slovak State, and Carpathian Ruthenia and southern Slovakia (Hungary).

As a result, the Holocaust unfolded differently in each of these areas:

- The Holocaust in the Sudetenland
- The Holocaust in Bohemia and Moravia
- The Holocaust in Slovakia
- The Holocaust in Hungary
