= Netherland-America Foundation =

American-based nonprofit organization

The Netherland-America Foundation also known as ”the NAF” is an American 501(c)(3), non-profit organization based in New York City with nine additional chapters in the United States and one chapter in the Netherlands. The mission of the foundation is the support of exchange between the countries in education, performing and visual arts, sciences, business, and public policy.

== History ==
The Netherland-America Foundation was founded in 1921 to support bilateral exchange between the United States and the Netherlands. Two of its founders were Franklin D. Roosevelt, later the U.S. president, and Thomas J. Watson, founder of IBM.

In 2004, Netherlands-American Amity Trust was acquired by the foundation. The Foundation is currently (2019) under the patronage of members of the Royal Family of the Netherlands, Princess Margriet of the Netherlands, and her husband Pieter van Vollenhoven.

== Organization ==
The NAF has chapters in Atlanta, Boston, Chicago, Houston, New York City, Northern California, Southern California, Washington, D.C., West Michigan, and the Netherlands.

Andy Bender serves as the organization's chairman and Willemijn Keizer is its executive director.
