= Nicholas Merrick =

American diplomat and businessman

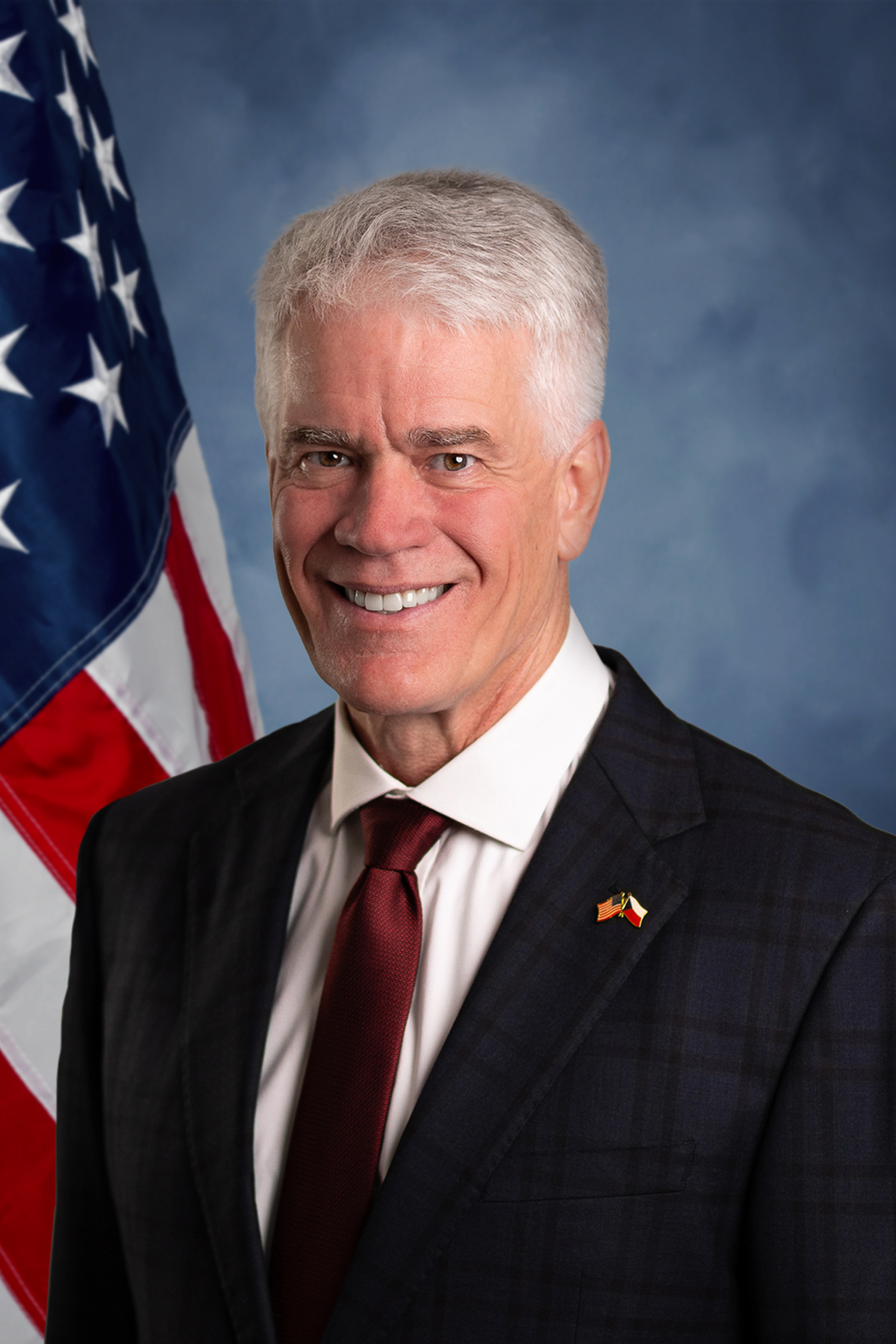
- Official portrait, 2025

11th United States Ambassador to the Czech Republic
- Incumbent
- Assumed office October 23, 2025
- President: Donald Trump
- Preceded by: Bijan Sabet

Personal details
- Education: University of Virginia (BS); Harvard University (MBA)

Nicholas Merrick is an American businessman and diplomat. In 2025, he was nominated to serve as U.S. Ambassador to the Czech Republic.

== Early life and education ==
Merrick earned his Bachelor of Science degree from the University of Virginia, where he played football, in 1985 and an MBA from Harvard University in 1990.

== Career ==
Merrick served as executive vice president and chief financial officer of Excel Communications up to its merger with Teleglobe.

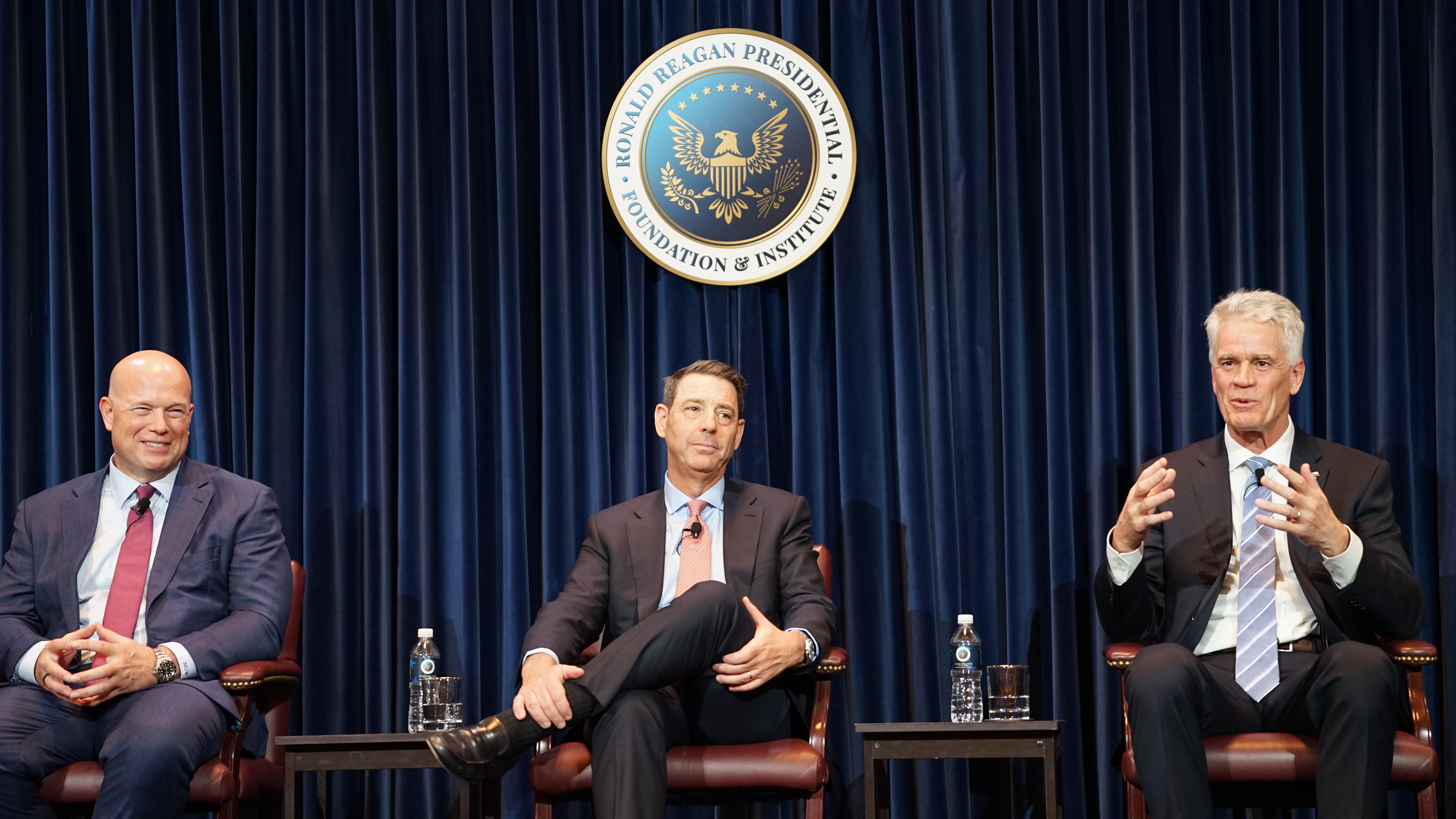
Matthew Whitaker, Joseph Popolo, Nicholas Merrick at Reagan Library

Merrick is the Founder and President of Mt. Vernon Investments, the family office investment firm of Kenny Troutt and Lisa Troutt. Merrick also served as Chairman of the Board of Trustees of the Dallas Police & Fire Pension System.

In June 2025, the Senate Foreign Relations Committee held a hearing to examine Merrick's nomination to serve as U.S. Ambassador to the Czech Republic.
