= Stolpersteine in Prague-Josefov =

Memorial installations in Czech Republic

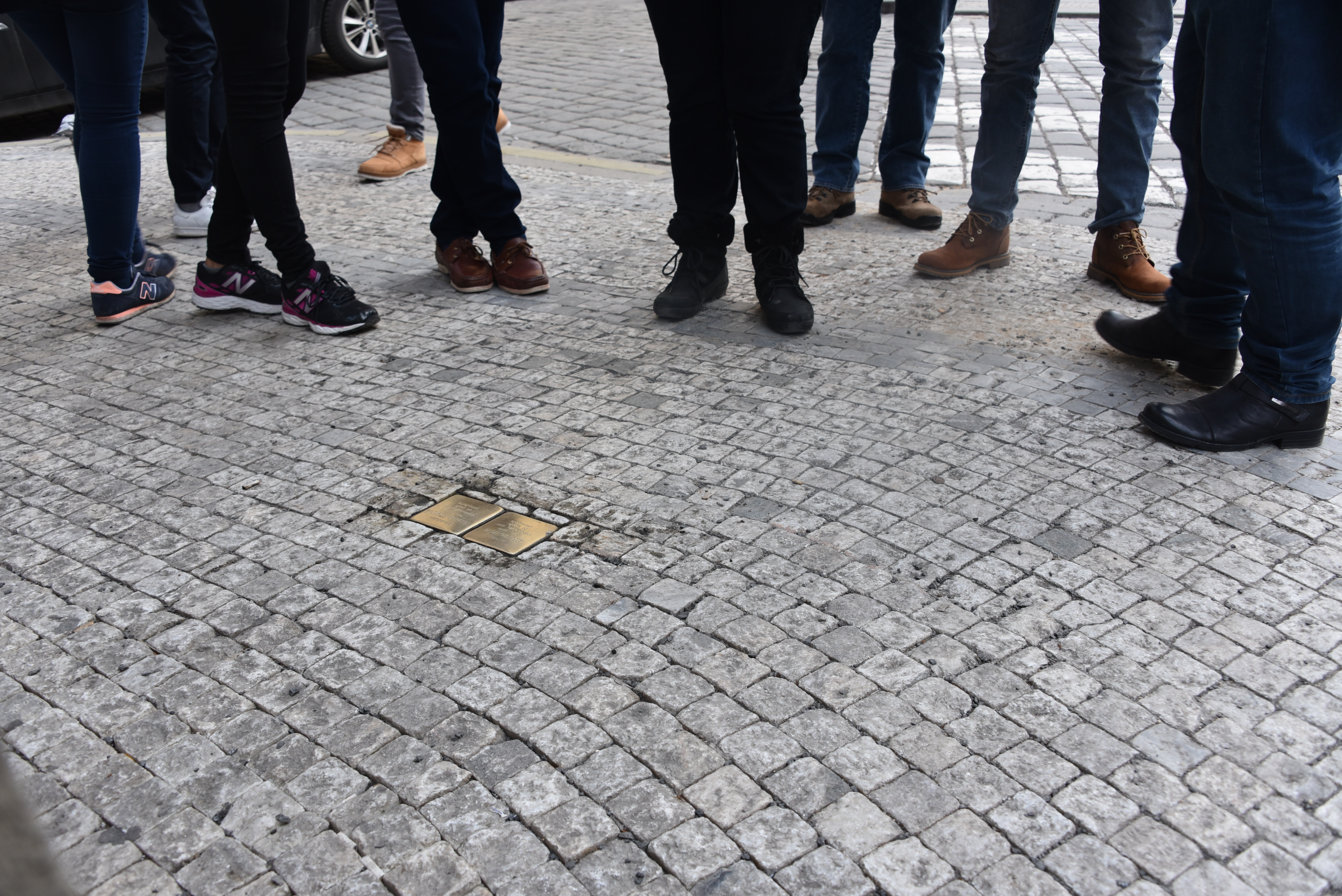
A guided tour through Prague stops at the stumbling stones for Eduard Böhm and Hermína Böhmová in Franz Kafka square, 2017

This article lists the Stolpersteine in the town quarter Josefov of Prague, the former Jewish quarter of the city. Stolpersteine is the German name for stumbling blocks collocated all over Europe by German artist Gunter Demnig. They remember the fate of the Nazi victims being murdered, deported, exiled or driven to suicide.

Generally, the stumbling blocks are posed in front of the building where the victims had their last self-chosen residence. The name of the Stolpersteine in Czech is: Kameny zmizelých, stones of the disappeared.

The project in the Czech Republic, namely in Josefov, was launched in 2008 by the Czech Union of Jewish Students.

== Josefov ==
Josefov (German: Josefstadt) is a town quarter and the smallest cadastral area of Prague, formerly the Jewish quarter of the town. It is completely surrounded by the Old Town (Czech: Staré Město pražské). Jews supposedly settled in Prague as early as the 10th century. In 1096 the first pogrom (the first crusade) took place. Eventually all Jews were concentrated within the Ghetto, shut off from the outside world by fortified walls with gates (1230–1530). As early as in the 11th, 12th and 13th centuries, Prague developed into a center of rabbinical scholarship and formed a school of Tosafists. In 1262 Přemysl Otakar II issued a Statuta Judaeorum which granted the community a certain degree of self-administration. On Easter Sunday of 1389 one of the worst pogroms took place, the probable number of victims during the massacre ranged from about 500 to more than 3,000.

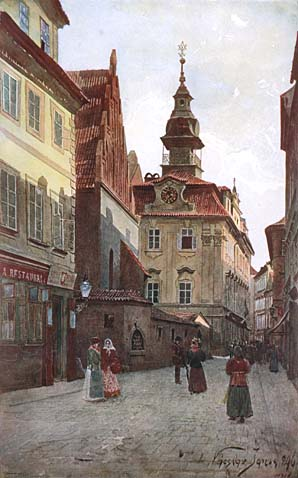
The Old New Synagogue or Altneuschul (Czech: Staronová synagoga) in Josefov (Painting by Václav Jansa)

The ghetto was most prosperous towards the end of the 16th century and at the beginning of the 17th century when Judah Loew ben Bezalel served as Rabbi, when a Yeshiva was founded and when the Jewish Mayor, Mordecai Maisel, became the Minister of Finance. The very wealthy man helped develop the ghetto. By then, Prague was seen as a Hebrew metropolis in Central Europe. By 1638 the Jewish population of Prague had increased to more than 7.800. In 1744 Empress Maria Theresa ordered all Jews to leave the city. Four years later they were allowed to return. In 1848 Jews were granted permission to settle also outside the ghetto. The small district supposedly housed about 18,000 inhabitants at a certain time. Soon the wealthy Jews moved to less crowded areas. In 1850 the quarter was renamed "Josefstadt" (Joseph's City) after Emperor Joseph II who emancipated Jews with the Toleration Edict in 1781. Gradually the share of the Jewish population in Josefov decreased, with mainly orthodox and poor Jews remaining there. Between 1893 and 1913 most of the quarter was demolished as part of a restoration of the city following the model of Paris. Due to protests of inhabitants six synagogues could be saved, furthermore the old cemetery and the Old Jewish Town Hall. They are now all part of the Jewish Museum in Prague. A new boulevard with luxurious buildings and shops was created, the Paris Street (Czech: Pařížská). Only rich Jews could afford housing in the newly built blocks, the poorer ones moved away. Josefov lost its traditional identity and the quarter was integrated in the Old Town.

In the 19th century, Jews got caught up in the culture wars between Czech-speaking middle class and German-speaking members of the Austro-Hungarian empire. Beginning in the 1830s many Jews began to adopt German and tried hard to assimilate. In the 1870s, however, Czech nationalism increased substantially and by the last quarter of the 19th Century, a network of Czech-Jewish institutions was created. Not all Jews supported this trend, many remained faithful to German language and culture while others favored the upcoming Zionism. Conflict between the Zionists and the Czech Jewish nationalists evolved and the Jewish community was deeply divided. German speaking and writing Jews as Franz Kafka, Max Brod and Franz Werfel became world-famous novelists of the early 20th century.

Immediately after the destruction of Czechoslovakia by Hitler and the unlawful invasion of Nazi troops in Prague all Czech Jews became victims of several sanctions. In June 1939, Adolf Eichmann arrived in Prague, confiscated a Jewish villa in Stresovice and established The Central Office for Jewish Emigration. He forced the Jewish representatives Emil Kafka and Jakob Edelstein to comply with all his orders. At that time approximately 56,000 Jews lived in Prague. They were step by step excluded from economic life, deprived of their property, segregated in Prague restaurants and prohibited from using public baths and swimming pools. They were excluded from the movie and theatre industries, restricted to the back of the second car on Prague trams and excluded from all hotels except the Fiser and the Star. They had to wear the Judenstern and were banned from public service and all social, cultural and economic organizations. In August 1940 Jewish children were excluded from Czech schools and in October Jews were denied access to a wide range of rationed goods. On 10 October 1941 Reinhard Heydrich, Karl Hermann Frank and Eichmann developed the plan to deport all Jews from the Protectorate of Bohemia and Moravia to Łódź Ghetto, Minsk and Riga, and to establish Theresienstadt concentration camp. The Holocaust had begun.

Flag of Josefov (assumed)

The quarter is often represented by the flag of Prague's Jewish community, a yellow Magen David (Star of David) on a red field.

== Methodological problems ==
A scientifically correct list of all Stolpersteine in Prague does not exist. Neither the artist, nor the organizers of the collocations do know exactly how many Stolpersteine have been posed in Prague and where they have been collocated. The website stolpersteine.cz all of a sudden disappeared in late 2016. Therefore, this list constitutes a work-in-progress. Step by step all Prague districts will be visited and all available addresses will be checked. Nevertheless, at this point we cannot guarantee that the list below contains all Stolpersteine of Josefov. You can help by adding reliable sources and additional information — either on this page or on the talk page. If you have general remarks please use the talk page of the WikiProject Stolpersteine.

The lists are sortable; the basic order follows the alphabet according to the last name of the victim.

== List of Stolpersteine ==
Stone	Inscription	Location	Life and death
	HERE LIVED; ALOIS BERGMANN; BORN 1899; DEPORTED 1942; TO THERESIENSTADT; MURDERED; IN BARANOVICHI	Maiselova 60/3; 50°05′18″N 14°25′07″E	Alois Bergmann was born on 18 June 1899 in Osoblaha. His parents were Samuel Bergmann and Emma née Eisnerová. He was married with Beila née Schuminer, also Berta. The couple had one daughter, Růžena, born 1931. After the Nazi occupation of Czechoslovakia Bergmann and his wife planned emigration to Shanghai. In 1940 they requested therefore certificates of good conduct. Nevertheless, they did not succeed in fleeing in time. On 2 July 1942 Alois Bergmann, his wife and his daughter were deported from Prague to Theresienstadt concentration camp with Transport AAl. His transport number was 828 of 1005. On 28 July 1942 the family was deported to Baranovichi with Transport AAy. His transport number was 127 of 1001. No one of this transport survived the Shoah. All three members of the Bergmann family were murdered by the Nazi regime.
	HERE LIVED; BEILA; BERGMANNOVÁ; BORN 1897; DEPORTED 1942; TO THERESIENSTADT; MURDERED; IN BARANOVICHI	Maiselova 60/3; 50°05′18″N 14°25′07″E	Beila Bergmannová née Schuminer was born on 18 July 1897 in Fesztyn. Her parents were Baruch and Rosa Schuminer. She married Alois Bergmann. The couple had a daughter named Růžena, born in 1931. The plans to emigrate to Shanghai failed. On 2 July 1942, Beila Bergmannová, her husband and her daughter were deported from Prague to Theresienstadt concentration camp with Transport AAl. Her transport number was 827 of 1005. On 28 July 1942 the family was deported to Baranovichi with Transport AAy. Her transport number was 126 of 1001. All passengers of this transport were murdered during the Shoah, also Beila Bergmannová, her husband and her eleven years old daughter Růžena.
	HERE LIVED; RŮŽENA; BERGMANNOVÁ; BORN 1931; DEPORTED 1942; TO THERESIENSTADT; MURDERED; IN BARANOVICHI	Maiselova 60/3; 50°05′18″N 14°25′07″E	Růžena Bergmannová was born on 6 January 1931. Her parents were Alois and Beila Bergmann. On 2 July 1942 she was deported together with her parents on transport AAl from Prague to Theresienstadt concentration camp. Her transport number was 829. On 28 Juli 1942 she was deported, again together with her parents, on transport AAy to the ghetto of Baranovichi where more than 12,000 Jews were kept in terrible conditions in six buildings at the outskirts. Her transport number was 128 of 1,001. None of these Jews transported to Baranovichi survived the Shoah. Růžena Bergmannová and her parents were murdered by the Nazi regime in one of the extermination camps.
	HERE LIVED; EDUARD BÖHM; BORN 1874; DEPORTED 1941; TO ŁÓDŹ; MURDERED	Nám. Franze Kafky 2; 50°05′17″N 14°25′08″E	Eduard Böhm was born on 18 October 1874 in Teplice. He was the son of Alois Böhm and Eliska Kraus. He married Hermína Fischer, also known as Fišerová. The couple had one son (Jiří, born on 19 December 1921). Böhm worked as a traveling salesman for a textile company. His last address before deportation was Kaprová 13. Together with his wife Hermína he was deported to the Łódź Ghetto with transport C on 26 October 1941. His transport number was 787. The couple was killed during the Holocaust. His son Jiří could survive the Holocaust. In 1940 he was sent to Palestine. He was one of the survivors of the Patria disaster. After 1945 he returned to Prague and became the father of two children (Milan and Jiřina, later married as Matoušková). Both kids had two children each.
	HERE LIVED; HERMÍNA BÖHMOVÁ; BORN 1881; DEPORTED 1941; TO ŁÓDŹ; MURDERED	Nám. Franze Kafky 2; 50°05′17″N 14°25′08″E	Hermína Böhmová was born as Fišerová on 15 March 1881. Her last address before deportation was Kaprová 13. She married Eduard Böhm. The couple had one son (Jiří, born on 19 December 1921) and two grand children (Milan and Jiřina, later married as Matoušková). Together with her husband Eduard she was deported to the Łódź Ghetto with transport C on 26 October 1941. Her transport number was 788. The couple was killed during the Holocaust. Her son Jiří could survive the Holocaust. In 1940 he was sent to Palestine. He was one of the survivors of the Patria disaster. After 1945 he returned to Prague and became the father of two children (Milan and Jiřina, later married as Matoušková). Thus Hermína Böhmová became twice grand mother after her cruel death and later on four times grand grand mother.
	HERE LIVED; MAX ECKSTEIN; BORN 1896; DEPORTED 1941; TO ŁÓDŹ; MURDERED	Jáchymova 63/3; 50°05′19″N 14°25′09″E	Max Eckstein was born on 17 April 1896 in Liběchov. He was the son of Ferdinand and Julie Eckstein. He had seven siblings: Alois (1890-?), Arnošt (1891–1942), Anna Salus (1892–1942), Martha (1894-?), Emma (1898-?), Leo (1901–1941) and William (1904–1969). His last known address in Prague was Regnartova 4. He was deported to Łódź Ghetto on 26 October 1941. His transport number was 369. He was murdered by the Nazi regime. At least four of his brothers and sisters as well as two nieces and two nephews were also killed during the Shoah.
	HERE LIVED; RUDOLF; FREUDENFELD; BORN 1903; DEPORTED 1942; TO THERESIENSTADT; MURDERED 1944; IN AUSCHWITZ	Elišky Krásnohorské 11/4; 50°05′25″N 14°25′11″E	Rudolf Freudenfeld was born on 4 September 1903 in Beszterec as his father Sigmund Vítězslav Freudenfeld served there as a member of the Austrian-Hungarian Army. His mother was Adéla born Marmorstein. He had three brothers (Josef, Gustav and Emil) and three sisters (Margit, Elsa and Charlota). He became a locksmith and married Marií née Hazsová. The couple had seven children: Otta Freudenfeld (1922–1970), Adela, Ethel or Etela Freudenfeldová, later married as Waniová (1923–2008), Josef Freudenfeld, also called Pepi (1926–1987), Anna Freudenfeldová, later married as Srbová (1927–1978), Jiří Freudenfeld (1929–2013), Rosemarie Freudenfeldová (1933–2011), Hildegarda Freudenfeldová (1935–1984).; in 1929, the family moved to Prague. On 3 August 1942 Rudolf Freudenfeld was deported from Prague to Theresienstadt concentration camp with Transport AAw. His transport number was 66 of 1001. On 28 September 1944 he was deported to Auschwitz concentration camp with Transport Ek. His transport number was 1782 of 2500. He was killed by the Nazi regime. His mother and at least three of his siblings were also murdered during the Shoah. The fate of his wife is unknown, all of their seven children could survive.
	HERE LIVED; ADÉLA; FREUDENFELDOVÁ; BORN 1881; DEPORTED 1942; TO THERESIENSTADT; MURDERED 1942; IN AUSCHWITZ	Elišky Krásnohorské 11/4; 50°05′25″N 14°25′11″E	Adéla Freudenfeldová was born on 11 July 1881 in Nové Zámky (Slovakia) as Adela Marmorstein. She was the daughter of Samuel and Jana Johanna Marmorstein. She married Sigmund Vítězslav Freudenfeld, born on 28 July 1874 in Liběšice. The couple had seven children: Josef Freudenfeld, born on 20 May 1900; Margit Freudenfeld, born on 2 December 1901; Rudolf Freudenfeld, born on 4 September 1903 in Beszterec, married to Marie, with seven children; Elsa Freudenfeld, born on 20 May 1905; Gustav Freudenfeld, born on 20 November 1907 in Mostar; Emil Freudenfeld, born on 20 October 1909 in Mostar; Charlota Freudenfeld, also Šarlota, born on 7 or 17 December 1911 in Mostar, later married to Marek Žižala.; On 2 July 1942 Adéla Freudenfeldová was deported with Transport AAl from Prague to Theresienstadt concentration camp. Her transport number was 200. On 26 October 1942 she was deported with Transport By to Auschwitz concentration camp. Her transport number was 761. There she was murdered by the Nazi regime. Her sons Rudolf, Gustav and Emil, her youngest daughter Charlota, and Charlota's five-year-old son Mirek were also murdered during the Shoah. Gustav died on 16 August 1942 in Theresienstadt concentration camp, Emil in late 1942 in Treblinka extermination camp, Charlota and Mirek on 23 January 1943 in Auschwitz concentration camp and Rudolf on 28 September 1944 also in Auschwitz. The fate of the other children is unknown. Seven grandchildren of Adéla Freudenfeldová, the children of her son Rudolf, could survive.
	HERE LIVED; ERVÍN FRÖHLICH; BORN 1903; DEPORTED; 1942 TO THERESIENSTADT; 1943 TO AUSCHWITZ; MURDERED	Pařížská 34; 50°05′27″N 14°25′07″E	Ervín Fröhlich was born on 18 March 1903 in Prague. His parents were Leopold Fröhlich and Pavla born Porges. He had at least one sister, Irma, and he was married to Vera. Ervín Fröhlich was a physician, specialized in internal medicine. He practiced in Prague and lived in an apartment, together with two subtenants, Rudolf Reich and Friedrich Glücklich. On 21 August 1942 he was told by Nazi authorities that his apartment had to be ″disinfected″. Therefore, he and subtenants had to leave. His last address before deportation was a flat in Norimberská where also his mother and his friend Rudolf Reich lived until their deportations. On 20 November 1942 he was deported with transport Cc from Prague to Theresienstadt concentration camp. His transport number was 266. At the time he arrived there, his mother, who was incarcerated in Theresienstadt from July to October, had already left. From there he was deported with transport Cq to Auschwitz concentration camp. His transport number was 539. Ervín Fröhlich was murdered in Auschwitz. His mother had been deported to Treblinka extermination camp in October 1942 and was thereafter murdered by the Nazis. His friend Rudolf Reich was deported to Auschwitz in 1943 and murdered there in the course of the same year. Sister Irma could survive the Shoah. At the time she reported the death of her mother and her brother to Yad Vashem, in 1987, she lived in Chicago, was married to Max Czerner and carried his name. Irma had four children. Among them was Raya Czerner Schapiro (born 1934 in Prague, deceased 2007 in Chicago), the mother of Andrew H. Schapiro.
	HERE LIVED; PAVLA FRÖHLICHOVÁ; BORN 1876; DEPORTED; 1942 TO THERESIENSTADT; 1942 TO TREBLINKA; MURDERED	Pařížská 34; 50°05′27″N 14°25′07″E	Pavla Fröhlichová née Porgesová, also Paula or Pauline, was born on 23 October 1876 in Rokycany. She married Leopold Fröhlich, a salesman. The couple had two children: Ervín, born in 1903, and Irma, born in 1904. Ervín became a physician, specialized in internal medicine. In 1936, the husband of Paula Fröhlichová died. After the Nazi occupation of Czechoslovakia in 1938, Irma and her husband succeeded in emigrating to the United States, together with their son Tomachek, who was then only five months old. But they had to leave back their two daughters as they got only three visas. Pavla Fröhlichová and her son took care of the two girls and could also achieve visas for them in 1939. On 9 July 1942 Pavla Fröhlichová was arrested and deported with transport AAp from Prague to Theresienstadt concentration camp. Her transport number was 860. On 19 October 1942 she was deported again, this time with transport Bw to Treblinka extermination camp. Her transport number was 796. There, Pavla Fröhlichová was gassed on 23 October 1942. It was her 66th birthday. Son Ervín was also deported within a short period after the death of his mother and was murdered by the Nazi regime in Auschwitz concentration camp. In 1987, Irma reported the deportation and death of her mother and her brother to the Central Database of Shoah's victims' names in Yad Vashem. She lived then in Chicago, was married to Max Czerner and had given birth to two more kids. One of her daughters, Raya Czerner Schapiro, described her story and the story of her family in a book called Letters from Prague: 1939–1941. Raya's son, Andrew H. Schapiro, became an attorney and diplomat. From 2014 to 2017 he served as the United States Ambassador to the Czech Republic.
	HERE LIVED; EMÍLIE FUCHSOVÁ; BORN 1883; DEPORTED 1942; TO THERESIENSTADT; MURDERED	Kaprová 16/9; 50°05′17″N 14°25′03″E	Emílie Fuchsová née Löbl was born on 28 October 1883 in Prague. She married Oskar Fuchs. The couple had one daughter: Hella, born on 7 November 1910 in Prague. On 23 July 1942, Emílie Fuchsová and her daughter were deported from Prague to Theresienstadt concentration camp with transport AAt. Her transport number was 329. On 19 October 1944, again with her daughter, she war deported to Auschwitz concentration camp with transport Es. Her transport number was 429. Mother and daughter were both murdered at Auschwitz.
	HERE LIVED; HELENA FUCHSOVÁ; BORN 1910; DEPORTED 1942; TO THERESIENSTADT; MURDERED	Kaprová 16/9; 50°05′17″N 14°25′03″E	Helena Fuchsová, also Hella Fuchsová, was born on 7 November 1910 in Prague. She was the only child of Oskar Fuchs and Emílie Fuchsová. On 23 July 1942, Helena Fuchsová and her mother were deported from Prague to Theresienstadt concentration camp with transport AAt. Her transport number was 328. On 19 October 1944, again with her daughter, she war deported to Auschwitz concentration camp with transport Es. Her transport number was 23. Mother and daughter were both murdered at Auschwitz.
	HERE LIVED; DR. MED. OTTO HELLER; BORN 1895; DEPORTED 1943; TO THERESIENSTADT; MURDERED	Bílkova 131/2; 50°05′27″N 14°25′07″E	MUDr. Otto Heller, also Ota, was born on 3 July 1895. He became a physician and married Johanna née Skallová (1901–1981). The couple had one daughter, Zuzana (born 1927). On 5 July 1943 he was deported with his wife and his daughter with transport De from Prague to Theresienstadt concentration camp. His transport number was 401 of 604. On 6 September 1943 he was deported, again with his wife and daughter Zuzana, with transport Dl to Auschwitz concentration camp. His transport number was 761 of 2484. He — as well as 2451 other Jews from this transport — was murdered by the Nazi regime. His mother-in-law, Berta Skallová née Morgenstern, was brought to death by the Nazi regime on 11 May 1943 in Theresienstadt. His daughter Zuzana, married Holitscherová, survived several Nazi concentration camps including the Auschwitz-Birkenau Family Camp. She lived in Prague until her death in 2017. Otto's wife also survived.
	HERE LIVED; OTA KLEIN; BORN 1895; DEPORTED; 1943 TO THERESIENSTADT; 1944 TO AUSCHWITZ; MURDERED 6.1.1945; IN DACHAU	Elišky Krásnohorské 133/11	Ota Klein was born on 22 July 1895. On 8 July 1943 he was deported with transport Dh from Prague to Theresienstadt concentration camp. His transport number was 332 of 486. On 28 September 1944 he was deported with transport Ek to Auschwitz concentration camp. His transport number was 2422 of 2500. He was murdered by the Nazi regime on 6 January 1945 in Dachau concentration camp.
	HERE LIVED; BERTA; KRUMPELESOVÁ; BORN 1859; DEPORTED 1942; MURDERED 1942; IN THERESIENSTADT	Břehová 202/4; 50°05′27″N 14°25′04″E	Berta Krumpelesová was born on 28 January 1859. Her last residence in Prague before deportation was Břehová 4. On 20 July 1942 she was deported with transport AAs to Theresienstadt concentration camp. Her transport number was 420. She lost her life in Theresienstadt.
	HERE LIVED; DR. GERTRUD LOEW; BORN 1912; DEPORTED 1943; TO THERESIENSTADT; MURDERED 1944; IN AUSCHWITZ	Pařížská 131/28; 50°05′26″N 14°25′08″E	Dr. Gertrud Loew née Hertzka was born on 19 June 1912 in Litoměřice as Gertrud Hertzka. Her parents were Dr. Alfred Hertzka and Maria born Abeles. The address book of Litoměřice in the year 1935 lists herself (as a student) and her father (as a professor) with the address Richard-Wagner-Straße 1. She studied Economics and married Hans Loew, a lawyer. She then worked at the Czechoslovak Ministry for International Trade. The couple had no children. On 13 July 1943 she was deported from Prague to Theresienstadt concentration camp, on 6 September 1943 to Auschwitz concentration camp. Both man and wife were murdered there in 1944. Her father had already been deported to the Łódź Ghetto in 1941 where he was brought to death by the Nazi regime in 1942. The fate of her mother is unknown. The report to the Central Database of Shoah's victims' names in Yad Vashem was submitted by her sister, Elisabeth Schaffer born Hertzka, in 2009, a Holocaust survivor, then living in Berlin. A Stolperstein was also created for her father. It has been collocated in another quarter of Prague, in Korunní 1961/109 in Vinohrady.
	HERE LIVED; DR. HANS LOEW; BORN 1908; DEPORTED 1943; TO THERESIENSTADT; MURDERED 1944; IN AUSCHWITZ	Pařížská 131/28; 50°05′26″N 14°25′08″E	Dr. Dr. Hans Loew was born in 1912 in Prague. He was the son of Georg and Paula Loew. He studied law and became a lawyer. He married Gertrud Hertzka, an economist. The couple had no children. He and his wife were murdered at Auschwitz concentration camp in 1944. The report to the Central Database of Shoah's victims' names in Yad Vashem was submitted by his uncle, Oto Raubichek, in 1957.
	HERE LIVED; ERVÍN PFEFFER; BORN 1909; DEPORTED; 1942 TO THERESIENSTADT; 1944 TO AUSCHWITZ; MURDERED 18.3.1945; IN DACHAU	Břehová 202/4; 50°05′27″N 14°25′04″E	Ervín Pfeffer was born on 28 October 1909 in Prague. He was employed at a bank and married to Martha Pfeffer née Kraus. The couple had two children: Alena (born 1937) and Jiřina (born 1941). On 23 July 1942, Ervín Pfeffer was deported from Prague to Theresienstadt concentration camp, together with his wife and his two daughters with transport AAt (his number on the transport was the 537). From there he was deported to Auschwitz concentration camp on 1 October 1944, with the transport Em (his number on the transport was the 913). From here he was deported to Dachau at an unknown time and murdered there in 1945. Also his wife and children did not survive the Shoah.
	HERE LIVED; ALENA PFEFFEROVÁ; BORN 1937; DEPORTED; 1942 TO THERESIENSTADT; 1944 TO AUSCHWITZ; MURDERED	Břehová 202/4; 50°05′27″N 14°25′04″E	Alena Pfefferová was born on 20 August 1937 in Prague. She was the oldest daughter of Ervín and Martha Pfeffer. Her sister Jiřina was born in 1941. On 23 July 1942, she was deported from Prague to Theresienstadt concentration camp, together with her sister and her parents, with transport AAt (her number on the transport was the 539). On 6 October 1944, the little girl was deported to Auschwitz, together with her mother and sister, with transport Eo (her number on the transport was the 504). Alena Pfefferová has not survived the Shoah. Also her parents and her younger sister were murdered by the Nazis.
	HERE LIVED; JIŘINA PFEFFEROVÁ; BORN 1941; DEPORTED; 1942 TO THERESIENSTADT; 1944 TO AUSCHWITZ; MURDERED	Břehová 202/4; 50°05′27″N 14°25′04″E	Jiřina Pfefferová was born on 8 November 1941 in Prague. She was the younger daughter of Ervín and Martha Pfeffer. Her sister Alena was born in 1937. On 23 July 1942, she was deported from Prague to Theresienstadt concentration camp, together with her sister and her parents, with transport AAt (her number on the transport was the 539). On 6 October 1944, the little girl was deported to Auschwitz, together with her mother and sister, with transport Eo (her number on the transport was the 504). Jiřina Pfefferová has not survived the Shoah. Also her parents and her older sister were murderedby the Nazis.
	HERE LIVED; MARTA PFEFFEROVÁ; BORN 1909; DEPORTED; 1942 TO THERESIENSTADT; 1944 TO AUSCHWITZ; MURDERED	Břehová 202/4; 50°05′27″N 14°25′04″E	Marta Pfefferová née Kraus was born on 28 January 1909 in Prague. She was married to Ervín Pfeffer, a bank clerk. The couple had two daughters: Alena (born 1937) and Jiřina (born 1941). She was deported on 23 July 1942, together with her husband and her two daughters, on transport AAt (her number on this transport was the 538) to Theresienstadt concentration camp. On 6 October 944, she and her children were deported to Auschwitz with transport Eo (her number on this transport was the 503). Marta Pfefferová and her small children have not survived the Shoah. Her husband was also murdered, in Dachau in 1945.
	HERE LIVED; EVA MIA POLLAKOVÁ; BORN 1924; DEPORTED 1941; TO THERESIENSTADT; MURDERED 1944; IN AUSCHWITZ	17. listopadu 207/6; 50°05′29″N 14°25′03″E	Eva Mia Krása née Pollaková was born on 24 March 1924 in Vienna. Shortly before her birth, her parents Karl Pollak and Vilma Pollaková, as well as the sister Hana, born in 1921, had moved to Vienna. There her father was director of a hardware store company. The family lived in the Innere Stadt, in Seilerstätte 13. In 1933 the marriage of the parents was divorced. In 1934 Vilma and her two daughters moved back to Prague. In 1938 her father died in Switzerland. In Prague, the family lived first in Kaprova 12 but had to leave the apartment in October 1939, as the SS confiscated the building and set up offices here. Eva, her mother and her sister moved to Sanytrová 12 (now 17th Listopadu). This apartment was a "Jewish apartment", where another family (Otto Passer and Hedviga Passerová) lived with them. On 10 December 1941 she was deported together with her mother with the transport L from Prague to Theresienstadt concentration camp. Her transport number was the 293. There, her mother acquired sepsis and died on 1 January 1942. Eva Mia got to know František Krása, they married. On September 6, 1943, Eva and her husband were deported from Theresienstadt to Auschwitz concentration camp. Her transport number was 2609, that of her husband 2608. The couple came to the so-called family camp. Both Eva Mia and František Krása were murdered in the course of the Shoah, either in the Auschwitz gas chambers right after the family camp was dissolved between 8 and 9 March 1944 or after deportation to the Majdanek extermination camp. The fate of her sister Hana is not known.
	HERE LIVED; VILMA POLLAKOVÁ; NÉE ROUBÍČKOVÁ; BORN 1897; DEPORTED 1941; TO THERESIENSTADT; MURDERED 1942; IBIDEM	17. listopadu 207/6; 50°05′29″N 14°25′03″E	Vilma Pollaková née Roubicková was born on 24 or 25 December 1897 in Kolín. Her parents were Simon Roubíček and Klotylda née Kaufmannová, called also Chlotilde. She married Karl Pollak. The couple had two daughters: Hana, born on 5 February 1921, and Eva, born on 24 March 1924. In 1924, the family moved to Vienna where Karl worked as administrator in an iron mill. The family resided in Seilerstätte 13 in Vienna's center. In 1933, the couple divorced. Thereafter Vilma and her daughters moved to Prague where they lived in Kaprova 12. The former husband died in 1938 in Switzerland. In October 1939, the family had to move to a collection flat in Sanytrová 12 (today the street is called 17. listopadu). There they lived together with another Jewish family, Otto Passer and Hedviga Passerová. The apartment was located in close proximity to the SS headquarter in the building of the former Faculty of Law of Charles University closed down by the Nazis in 1939. On 10 December 1941 Vilma Pollaková and her daughter Eva were deported from Prague to Theresienstadt concentration camp with Transport L. Her transport number was 292 of 1006. The hygiene in the camp was terrible, Vilma acquired sepsis and died on 1 January 1942. Her daughter Eva was brought to Auschwitz concentration camp in September 1943 and thereafter murdered by the Nazi regime. The fate of Hana Pollaková is unknown.
	HERE LIVED; EMIL ROUBÍČEK; BORN 1894; DEPORTED 1943; TO THERESIENSTADT; MURDERED; IN AUSCHWITZ	Pařížská 30; 50°05′28″N 14°25′06″E	Emil Roubíček was born in 1894. He was the sixth son of Karl Roubíček (28 May 1857 – 1920) and Rosalie née Deutsch (28 May 1861 in Kácov – 15 December 1943 in Auschwitz). He had one sister and six brothers: Berta, born on 5 August 1883 in Prague, married Anton Lieblich, had two children with him: Franta and Marta, Josef, 1 September 1885 in Zbizuby, Rudolf, born 10 May 1887 in Zbizuby, deceased in 1923, Pavel, born 20 July 1889 in Zbizuby, Max, also known as Maxa, born 27 July 1891 in Prague, Robert, born 22 August 1893 in Prague, married Aranka Roubicek, had four children with her: Karel, Renee, Vera and a fourth child, Leopold, born 1895, married Maria Kleinova.; Emil married Helena. The couple had one son: Vittislav. On 8 July 1943 he was deported from Prague to Theresienstadt concentration camp with Transport Dh. His transport number was 397 of 486. On 29 September 1944 he was deported to Auschwitz concentration camp with Transport El. His transport number was 1335 of 1500. In Auschwitz, he was murdered by the Nazi regime. The fate of his wife is unknown. His mother, at least four of his siblings and two nieces were also murdered by the Nazi regime. Pavel was killed on 15 October 1942 and Max on 11 March 1943, both in Łódź Ghetto. Robert, his wife and their daughter Renee died on 26 January 1943 on a transport to Auschwitz concentration camp, the second daughter, Vera, was gassed in Auschwitz the day after. His sister Berta and her husband were both killed in Auschwitz. The only son of Emil and Helena survived the Shoah. He died in 1992, peacefully.
	HERE LIVED; ERICH SPALTER; BORN 1907; DEPORTED 1941; TO THERESIENSTADT; MURDERED	Bílkova 6/8; 50°05′28″N 14°25′12″E	Erich Spalter was born on 10 December 1907. His last address before deportation was Waldhauserova 8. On 30 October 1941 he was deported with transport H from Prague to Theresienstadt concentration camp. His transport number was 465. On 1 April 1942 he was deported to the ghetto of Piaski with transport Ag. His transport number was 71. End of 1942, beginning of 1943 the ghetto was liquidated with the use of Reserve Police Battalion 101 from Hamburg. Its inmates, loaded onto Holocaust trains, perished in the nearby Belzec extermination camp. Also Erich Spalter lost his life.
	HERE LIVED; ŠTĔPÁN MICHAEL; WINTERNITZ; BORN 1935; DEPORTED; 1942 TO THERESIENSTADT; 1944 TO AUSCHWITZ; MURDERED	Pařížská 1075/5; 50°05′18″N 14°25′11″E	Štěpán Michael Winternitz was born on 13 October 1935. He was the son of Rudolf Winternitz (later Vihan, 1901–1984) and Lore Winternitzová. His last known address in Prague was Norimberská 5. On 20 November 1942 he was deported to Theresienstadt concentration camp, together with his mother. His transport number was 49. On 4 October 1944 he was deported to Auschwitz concentration camp. His transport number was 1473. There, mother and son were murdered by the Nazi regime. It is unknown how his father survived the Nazi regime.
	HERE LIVED; LORE; WINTERNITZOVÁ; BORN 1904; DEPORTED; 1942 TO THERESIENSTADT; 1944 TO AUSCHWITZ; MURDERED	Pařížská 1075/5; 50°05′18″N 14°25′11″E	Lore Winternitzová née Banasch was born on 17 May 1904 in Hannover. She married Rudolf Winternitz (1901–1984). The couple had a son called Štěpán Michael, who was born in 1935. Her last known address in Prague was Norimberská 5. On 20 November 1942 she was deported to Theresienstadt concentration camp, together with her son. Her transport number was 48. On 4 October 1944 she was deported to Auschwitz concentration camp. Her transport number was 1472 (of 1500 Jews deported). There, mother and son were murdered by the Nazi regime.
	HERE LIVED; MIREK ŽÍŽALA; BORN 1938; DEPORTED 1942; TO THERESIENSTADT; MURDERED 1943; IN AUSCHWITZ	Elišky Krásnohorské 11/4; 50°05′25″N 14°25′11″E	Mirek Žížala was born in 1938. He was the son of Šarlota Žížalová née Freudenfeldová and the grandson of Adéla Freudenfeldová. Šarlota Žížalová and her son were deported in 1942 to Theresienstadt concentration camp and thereafter to Auschwitz concentration camp where both were murdered on 23 January 1943 in a gas chamber. Also his grandmother and several other relatives were killed during the Shoah.
	HERE LIVED; ŠARLOTA ŽÍŽALOVÁ; NÉE FREUDENFELDOVÁ; BORN 1911; DEPORTED 1942; TO THERESIENSTADT; MURDERED 1943; IN AUSCHWITZ	Elišky Krásnohorské 11/4; 50°05′25″N 14°25′11″E	Šarlota Žížalová née Freudenfeldová, also Charlota, was born on 7 or 17 December 1911 in Mostar. She was the daughter of Sigmund Vítězslav Freudenfeld and Adéla born Marmorstein. She had four brothers (Josef, Rudolf, Gustav and Emil) and two sisters (Margit and Elsa). She married a man named Žižala. The couple had a son, Mirek, born in 1938. Šarlota Žížalová and her son were deported in 1942 to Theresienstadt concentration camp and thereafter to Auschwitz concentration camp where both were murdered on 23 January 1943 in a gas chamber. The fate of her husband is unknown. Her mother, at least three of her siblings and several other family members were also murdered during the Shoah.

== Memorial plaques ==
The following memorial plaques have not been created by Gunter Demnig, they constitute imitations. Their inscriptions are not in Czech but in English and the engravings were not done by hand but mechanically. The collocation dates are unknown, but as there is a picture from 25 January 2010 with the memorial plaques already in place the collocations must have happened before that date.

Stone	Inscription	Location	Life and death
	IN LOVING MEMORY; OF; KAREL MAHLER; BORN 1920; CRUELLY MURDERED BY NAZIS; IN AUSCHWITZ 1942	Široká 55/8; 50°05′20″N 14°25′04″E	Karel Mahler was born on 25 September 1920. His parents were Jindřich Mahler and Klara née Rimer. His sister Sylvia was born in 1912. His father died on 23 December 1932. His last residence before deportation was in Charbuzice, a village in Královéhradecký kraj. On 21 December 1942 he was deported — together with his mother — with transport Ci from Hradec Králové to Theresienstadt concentration camp. His transport number was 214. On 1 February 1943 mother and son were deported with transport Cu (train 109) to Auschwitz concentration camp. His transport number was 441. Karel Mahler was murdered by the Nazi regime, most probably still in 1943. His sister Sylvia could survive the Shoah. She was married with Otto Adler. The couple had at least one daughter.
	IN LOVING MEMORY; OF; KLARA MAHLEROVA; BORN 1883; CRUELLY MURDERED BY NAZIS; IN AUSCHWITZ 1942	Široká 55/8; 50°05′20″N 14°25′04″E	Klara Mahlerová née Rimer was born on 9 April 1883 in Hradec Králové. She was married with Jindřich Mahler. The couple had two children: Sylvia, born on 2 December 1912 in Hradec Králové, and Karel, born in 1920. Her husband died on 23 December 1932. Her last residence before deportation was in Charbuzice, a village in Královéhradecký kraj. There she lived with her son. On 21 December 1942 mother and son were deported with transport Ci from Hradec Králové to Theresienstadt concentration camp. Her transport number was 215. On 1 February 1943 both were deported with transport Cu (train 109) to Auschwitz concentration camp. Her transport number was 44. Both Klara Mahlerová and her son Karel Mahler were murdered by the Nazi regime. Her daughter Sylvia could survive the Shoah. She was married with Otto Adler. The couple had at least one daughter.

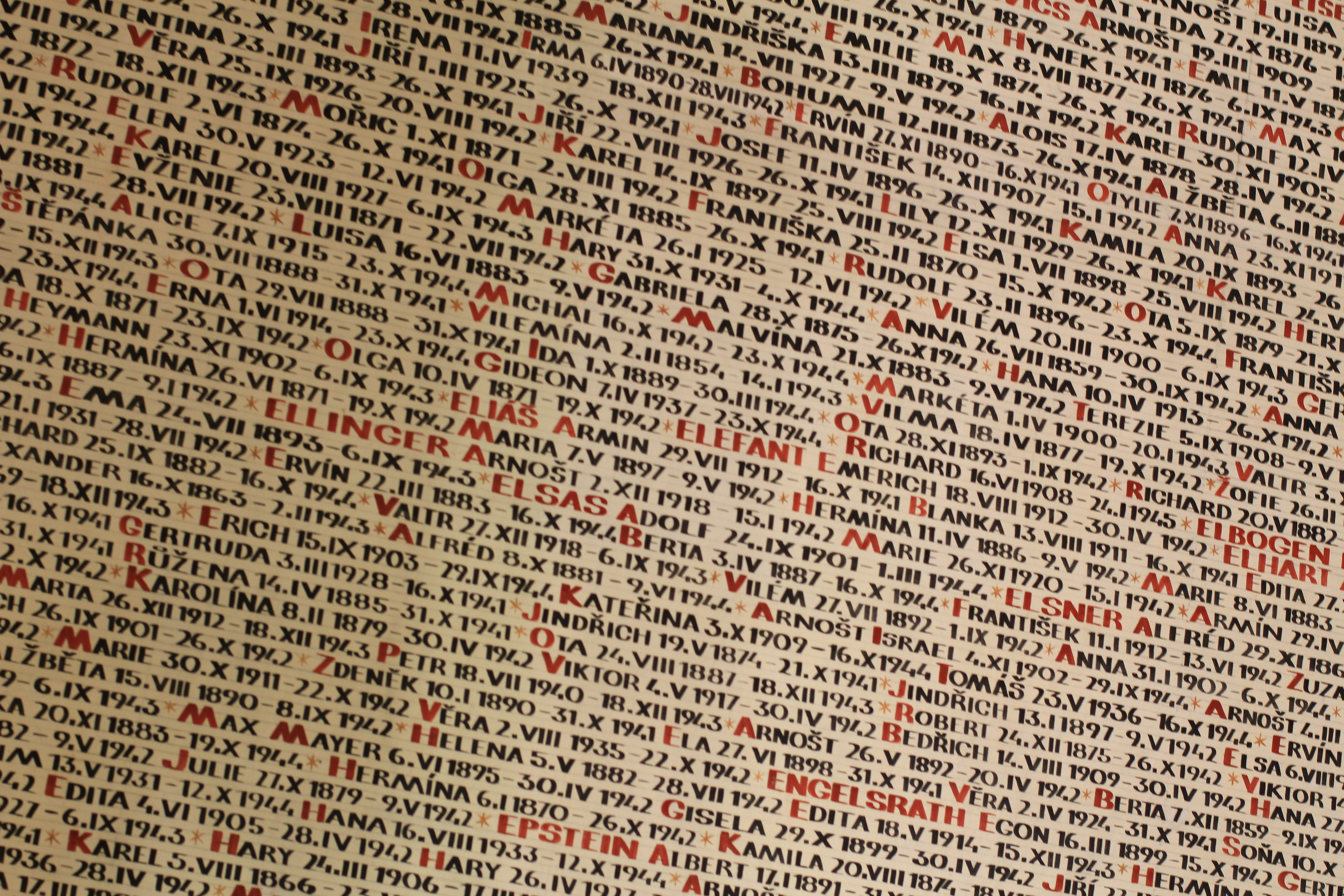
Names of Holocaust victims from Prague at the wall of Pinkas Synagogue

== Misleading informations ==
The now defunct website stolpersteine.cz included in their list also stumbling blocks for Gabriele Hermannová and Otílie Davidová, two of the three sisters of novelist Franz Kafka. These Stolpersteine were listed with the address Bílkova 132/4. Several tourists were misled and could not find the memorial plaques. The three Stolpersteine for two of the Kafka sisters and their maid were produced but never collocated. For unknown reasons the family had withdrawn its consent shortly before the collocation.

== Dates of collocations ==
According to the website of Gunter Demnig the Stolpersteine of Prague were posed by the artist himself on the following days:

- 8 October 2008: Jáchymova 63/3
- 7 November 2009: Maiselova 60/3
- 12 June 2010
- 13 to 15 July 2011
- 17 July 2013

A further collocation occurred on 28 October 2012, but is not mentioned on Demnig's page.

The Czech Stolperstein project was initiated in 2008 by the Česká unie židovské mládeže (Czech Union of Jewish Youth) and was realized with the patronage of the Mayor of Prague.

== See also ==
- List of places with Stolpersteine
- Stolpersteine in the Czech Republic
