= Zbizuby =

- Municipality
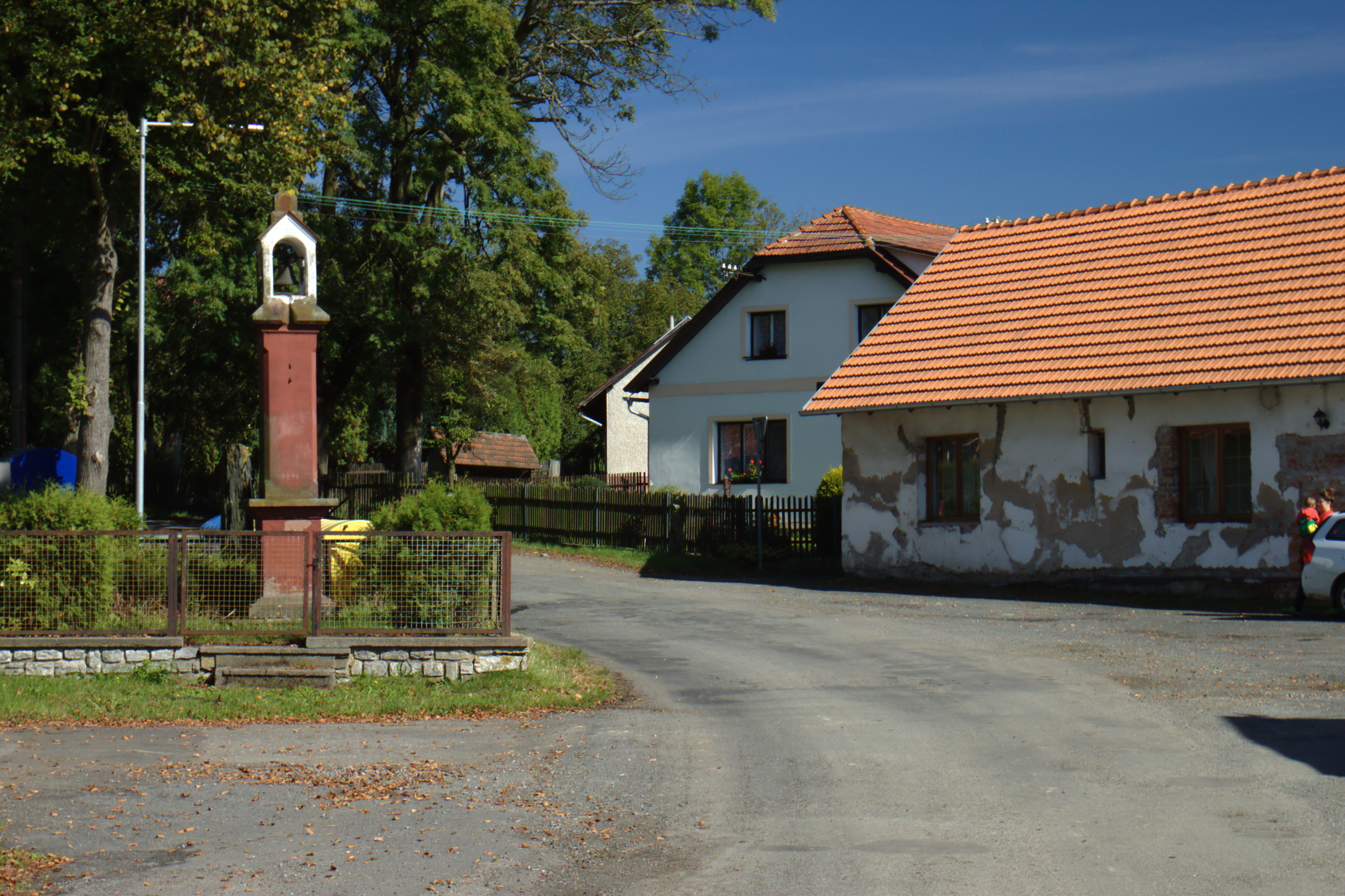
- Centre of Zbizuby

- Location in the Czech Republic
- Coordinates: 49°49′22″N 15°1′18″E
- Country: Czech Republic
- Region: Central Bohemian
- District: Kutná Hora
- First mentioned: 1295

Area
  - Total: 19.40 km^{2} (7.49 sq mi)
- Elevation: 483 m (1,585 ft)

Population (2026-01-01)
  - Total: 511
  - Density: 26.3/km^{2} (68.2/sq mi)
- Time zone: UTC+1 (CET)
  - Summer (DST): UTC+2 (CEST)
- Postal codes: 285 04, 285 06
- Website: www.zbizuby.cz

Zbizuby is a municipality and village in Kutná Hora District in the Central Bohemian Region of the Czech Republic. It has about 500 inhabitants.

== Administrative division ==
Zbizuby consists of eight municipal parts (in brackets population according to the 2021 census):

- Zbizuby (242)
- Hroznice (10)
- Koblasko (30)
- Makolusky (40)
- Nechyba (2)
- Vestec (8)
- Vlková (63)
- Vranice (86)

== Demographics ==
Historical population
Year	Pop.	±%
1869	1,499	—
1880	1,542	+2.9%
1890	1,516	−1.7%
1900	1,564	+3.2%
1910	1,389	−11.2%
1921	1,281	−7.8%
1930	1,120	−12.6%
1950	765	−31.7%
1961	738	−3.5%
1970	590	−20.1%
1980	483	−18.1%
1991	399	−17.4%
2001	388	−2.8%
2011	448	+15.5%
2021	481	+7.4%
Source: Censuses
