= List of members of the House of Representatives of the Netherlands, 1945–1946 =

Provisional House of Representatives
←	Sept–Nov 1945	1946–1948	→
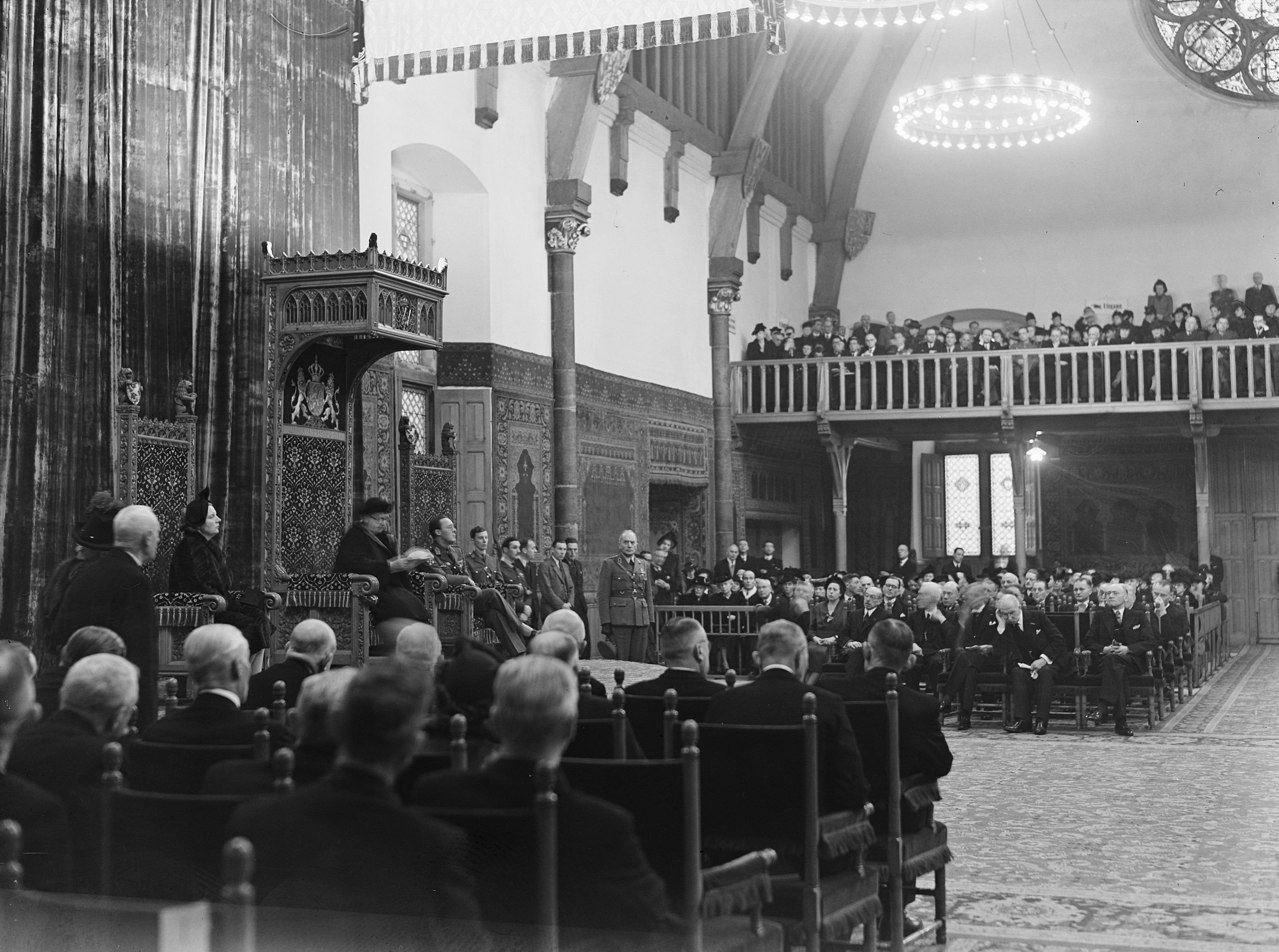
- Opening of the States-General on 20 November 1945 by Queen Wilhelmina in the Ridderzaal

Overview
- Legislative body: House of Representatives
- Meeting place: Binnenhof
- Term: 20 November 1945 – 3 June 1946
- Members: 100
- Speaker of the House of Representatives: Josef van Schaik

Between 20 November 1945 and 3 June 1946, 105 individuals served as representatives in the House of Representatives, the 100-seat lower house of the States-General of the Netherlands. This legislative session was known as the Provisional House of Representatives (Dutch: Voorlopige Tweede Kamer) and the last of two sessions collectively known as the emergency parliament.

76 representatives had been elected in the 1937 general election and had remained member during the Second World War and the Temporary House of Representatives. To fill the remaining seats, the National Advice Committee (NAC) had selected 24 representatives. These were mostly people who had distinguished themselves positively during the war. They were recommended by their political party. The seat distribution between parties was kept the same as after the 1937 election, except for the National Socialist Movement (NSB), whose representatives were replaced by prominent members of the Dutch resistance. Another 5 representatives were later appointed as replacements.

The House consisted of the Roman Catholic State Party (RKSP, 31 seats), Social Democratic Workers' Party (SDAP, 23 seats), Anti-Revolutionary Party (ARP, 17 seats), Christian Historical Union (CHU, 8 seats), Free-thinking Democratic League (VDB, 6 seats), Liberal State Party (LSP, 4 seats), Communist Party (CPN, 3 seats), Christian Democratic Union (CDU, 2 seats), Reformed Political Party (SGP, 2 seats) and 4 independents. The RKSP was succeeded by the Catholic People's Party (KVP) and the LSP was succeeded by the Freedom Party (PvdV). The SDAP, CDU and VDB merged into the Labour Party (PvdA) and were joined by two independents.

Henk van Randwijk and Hilda Verwey-Jonker (SDAP) were appointed by the NAC, but declined.

== Members ==
Members of the House of Representatives of the Netherlands, 1945–1946
Name	Parliamentary group	Assumed office	Term end	Ref.
Jacob Algera	ARP	20 November 1945	3 June 1946	
Herman Amelink	ARP	20 November 1945	3 June 1946	
Jan Andriessen	RKSP	20 November 1945	3 June 1946	
Jan Andriessen	KVP	20 November 1945	3 June 1946	
Gerrit Baas Klaaszoon	ARP	20 November 1945	3 June 1946	
Franciscus Joannes Herman Bachg	RKSP	20 November 1945	3 June 1946	
Franciscus Joannes Herman Bachg	KVP	20 November 1945	3 June 1946	
Max Bajetto	RKSP	20 November 1945	3 June 1946	
Max Bajetto	KVP	20 November 1945	3 June 1946	
Leo Beaufort	RKSP	20 November 1945	21 January 1946	
Leo Beaufort	KVP	20 November 1945	21 January 1946	
Steven Edzo Broeils Bierema	LSP	20 November 1945	3 June 1946	
Steven Edzo Broeils Bierema	PvdV	20 November 1945	3 June 1946	
Klaas Bijlsma	VDB	20 November 1945	3 June 1946	
Klaas Bijlsma	PvdA	20 November 1945	3 June 1946	
Jan van Bochove	SGP	20 November 1945	3 June 1946	
Henk van den Born	SDAP	20 November 1945	3 June 1946	
Henk van den Born	PvdA	20 November 1945	3 June 1946	
Cor Borst	CPN	11 April 1946	3 June 1946	
Hendrik Jan van Braambeek	SDAP	20 November 1945	3 June 1946	
Hendrik Jan van Braambeek	PvdA	20 November 1945	3 June 1946	
Jan Bommer	SDAP	20 November 1945	21 November 1945	
Rintje van der Brug	CHU	20 November 1945	3 June 1946	
Huub van den Brule	RKSP	20 November 1945	3 June 1946	
Huub van den Brule	KVP	20 November 1945	3 June 1946	
Jaap Burger	SDAP	20 November 1945	3 June 1946	
Jaap Burger	PvdA	20 November 1945	3 June 1946	
Laurentius Nicolaas Deckers	RKSP	20 November 1945	31 March 1946	
Laurentius Nicolaas Deckers	KVP	20 November 1945	31 March 1946	
Gerrit Diepenhorst	ARP	20 November 1945	3 June 1946	
Tiemen van Dijken	ARP	20 November 1945	3 June 1946	
Leendert Antonie Donker	SDAP	20 November 1945	3 June 1946	
Leendert Antonie Donker	PvdA	20 November 1945	3 June 1946	
Wim Droesen	RKSP	20 November 1945	3 June 1946	
Wim Droesen	KVP	20 November 1945	3 June 1946	
Lodewijk Duymaer van Twist	ARP	20 November 1945	3 June 1946	
Fekko Ebel Hajo Ebels	VDB	20 November 1945	3 June 1946	
Fekko Ebel Hajo Ebels	PvdA	20 November 1945	3 June 1946	
Roestam Effendi	CPN	20 November 1945	22 January 1946	
Frans Goedhart	Indep	20 November 1945	3 June 1946	
Frans Goedhart	PvdA	20 November 1945	3 June 1946	
Marinus van der Goes van Naters	SDAP	20 November 1945	3 June 1946	
Marinus van der Goes van Naters	PvdA	20 November 1945	3 June 1946	
Jaap Groen Azn.	RKSP	20 November 1945	3 June 1946	
Jaap Groen Azn.	KVP	20 November 1945	3 June 1946	
Paul de Groot	CPN	20 November 1945	3 June 1946	
Kees ten Hagen	Indep	20 November 1945	3 June 1946	
Kees ten Hagen	PvdA	20 November 1945	3 June 1946	
Pieter Heertjes	Indep	20 November 1945	3 June 1946	
Pieter Heertjes	PvdA	20 November 1945	3 June 1946	
Chris van den Heuvel	ARP	20 November 1945	3 June 1946	
Henk Hofstra	SDAP	20 November 1945	3 June 1946	
Henk Hofstra	PvdA	20 November 1945	3 June 1946	
Joseph Johan Wilhelm IJsselmuiden	RKSP	20 November 1945	3 June 1946	
Joseph Johan Wilhelm IJsselmuiden	KVP	20 November 1945	3 June 1946	
Arie IJzerman	SDAP	20 November 1945	3 June 1946	
Arie IJzerman	PvdA	20 November 1945	3 June 1946	
Dolf Joekes	VDB	20 November 1945	3 June 1946	
Dolf Joekes	PvdA	20 November 1945	3 June 1946	
Huub Jongen	RKSP	20 November 1945	3 June 1946	
Huub Jongen	KVP	20 November 1945	3 June 1946	
Carel Joseph van Kempen	LSP	20 November 1945	3 June 1946	
Carel Joseph van Kempen	PvdV	20 November 1945	3 June 1946	
Arie Kievit	SDAP	20 November 1945	3 June 1946	
Arie Kievit	PvdA	20 November 1945	3 June 1946	
Wim de Kort	RKSP	20 November 1945	3 June 1946	
Wim de Kort	KVP	20 November 1945	3 June 1946	
Rad Kortenhorst	RKSP	20 November 1945	3 June 1946	
Rad Kortenhorst	KVP	20 November 1945	3 June 1946	
Henk Korthals	LSP	20 November 1945	3 June 1946	
Henk Korthals	PvdV	20 November 1945	3 June 1946	
Jan Krijger	CHU	20 November 1945	3 June 1946	
Tjeerd Krol	CHU	20 November 1945	3 June 1946	
Herman van Kuilenburg	SDAP	20 November 1945	3 June 1946	
Herman van Kuilenburg	PvdA	20 November 1945	3 June 1946	
Evert Kupers	SDAP	20 November 1945	3 June 1946	
Evert Kupers	PvdA	20 November 1945	3 June 1946	
Kees van Lienden	SDAP	20 November 1945	3 June 1946	
Kees van Lienden	PvdA	20 November 1945	3 June 1946	
Toon Loerakker	RKSP	20 November 1945	3 June 1946	
Toon Loerakker	KVP	20 November 1945	3 June 1946	
Johannes Henricus van Maarseveen	RKSP	20 November 1945	3 June 1946	
Johannes Henricus van Maarseveen	KVP	20 November 1945	3 June 1946	
Hendrik Johan Wilhelm Adriaan Meijerink	ARP	20 November 1945	3 June 1946	
Louis Mes	RKSP	20 November 1945	3 June 1946	
Louis Mes	KVP	20 November 1945	3 June 1946	
Chris Mol	KVP	30 April 1946	3 June 1946	
Gerard Nederhorst	SDAP	10 January 1946	3 June 1946	
Gerard Nederhorst	PvdA	10 January 1946	3 June 1946	
Nico Palar	SDAP	20 November 1945	3 June 1946	
Henk Ploeg jr.	SDAP	20 November 1945	3 June 1946	
Henk Ploeg jr.	PvdA	20 November 1945	3 June 1946	
Max van Poll	RKSP	20 November 1945	3 June 1946	
Max van Poll	KVP	20 November 1945	3 June 1946	
Jaap le Poole	SDAP	20 November 1945	3 June 1946	
Jaap le Poole	PvdA	20 November 1945	3 June 1946	
Hessel Posthuma sr.	CDU	20 November 1945	3 June 1946	
Hessel Posthuma sr.	PvdA	20 November 1945	3 June 1946	
Tijn Receveur	RKSP	20 November 1945	3 June 1946	
Tijn Receveur	KVP	20 November 1945	3 June 1946	
Eugène Roolvink	RKSP	20 November 1945	3 June 1946	
Anton Roosjen	ARP	20 November 1945	3 June 1946	
Gustave Ruijs de Beerenbrouck	RKSP	20 November 1945	3 June 1946	
Gustave Ruijs de Beerenbrouck	KVP	20 November 1945	3 June 1946	
Jo de Ruiter	CHU	20 November 1945	3 June 1946	
Jan Willem Hendrik Rutgers van Rozenburg	CHU	20 November 1945	3 June 1946	
Henk Ruyter	RKSP	20 November 1945	3 June 1946	
Henk Ruyter	KVP	20 November 1945	3 June 1946	
Theodoor François Marie Schaepman	RKSP	20 November 1945	3 June 1946	
Theodoor François Marie Schaepman	KVP	20 November 1945	3 June 1946	
Josef van Schaik	RKSP	20 November 1945	3 June 1946	
Jan Schilthuis	VDB	20 November 1945	3 June 1946	
Jan Schilthuis	PvdA	20 November 1945	3 June 1946	
Jan Schmal	CHU	20 November 1945	3 June 1946	
Jan Schouten	ARP	20 November 1945	3 June 1946	
Jos Serrarens	RKSP	20 November 1945	3 June 1946	
Jos Serrarens	KVP	20 November 1945	3 June 1946	
Harm van Sleen	SDAP	20 November 1945	3 June 1946	
Harm van Sleen	PvdA	20 November 1945	3 June 1946	
Wiebe van der Sluis	SDAP	20 November 1945	3 June 1946	
Wiebe van der Sluis	PvdA	20 November 1945	3 June 1946	
Jan Smallenbroek	ARP	20 November 1945	3 June 1946	
Chris Smeenk	ARP	20 November 1945	3 June 1946	
Setyadjit Soegondo	Indep	20 November 1945	3 June 1946	
Willem Steinmetz	RKSP	20 November 1945	3 June 1946	
Willem Steinmetz	KVP	20 November 1945	3 June 1946	
Siegried Stokman	KVP	26 March 1946	3 June 1946	
Jo Stokvis	SDAP	20 November 1945	3 June 1946	
Jo Stokvis	PvdA	20 November 1945	3 June 1946	
Eduard Joseph Marie Stumpel	RKSP	20 November 1945	3 June 1946	
Eduard Joseph Marie Stumpel	KVP	20 November 1945	3 June 1946	
Ko Suurhoff	SDAP	20 November 1945	3 June 1946	
Ko Suurhoff	PvdA	20 November 1945	3 June 1946	
Jos Sweens	RKSP	20 November 1945	3 June 1946	
Jos Sweens	KVP	20 November 1945	3 June 1946	
Corry Tendeloo	VDB	20 November 1945	3 June 1946	
Corry Tendeloo	PvdA	20 November 1945	3 June 1946	
Jan Terpstra	ARP	20 November 1945	3 June 1946	
Frans Teulings	RKSP	20 November 1945	3 June 1946	
Frans Teulings	KVP	20 November 1945	3 June 1946	
Hendrikus Tilanus	CHU	20 November 1945	3 June 1946	
Jetze Tjalma	ARP	20 November 1945	3 June 1946	
Pieter Willem Hendrik Truijen	RKSP	20 November 1945	3 June 1946	
Pieter Willem Hendrik Truijen	KVP	20 November 1945	3 June 1946	
Huub van Velthoven	RKSP	20 November 1945	3 June 1946	
Huub van Velthoven	KVP	20 November 1945	3 June 1946	
Evert Vermeer	SDAP	10 January 1946	3 June 1946	
Evert Vermeer	PvdA	10 January 1946	3 June 1946	
Netty de Vink	RKSP	20 November 1945	3 June 1946	
Netty de Vink	KVP	20 November 1945	3 June 1946	
Jan Vlam	SDAP	22 November 1945	3 June 1946	
Jan Vlam	PvdA	22 November 1945	3 June 1946	
Agnes de Vries-Bruins	SDAP	20 November 1945	3 June 1946	
Agnes de Vries-Bruins	PvdA	20 November 1945	3 June 1946	
Gerben Wagenaar	CPN	20 November 1945	3 June 1946	
Martien van der Weijden	RKSP	20 November 1945	3 June 1946	
Martien van der Weijden	KVP	20 November 1945	3 June 1946	
Jan Weitkamp	CHU	20 November 1945	3 June 1946	
Willem Carel Wendelaar	LSP	20 November 1945	3 June 1946	
Willem Carel Wendelaar	PvdV	20 November 1945	3 June 1946	
Bernard Wijkamp	SDAP	20 November 1945	3 June 1946	
Bernard Wijkamp	PvdA	20 November 1945	3 June 1946	
Jacob Adriaan de Wilde	ARP	20 November 1945	3 June 1946	
Freule Wttewaall van Stoetwegen	CHU	20 November 1945	3 June 1946	
Cornelis van der Zaal	ARP	20 November 1945	3 June 1946	
Pieter Zandt	SGP	20 November 1945	3 June 1946	
Albertus Zijlstra	ARP	20 November 1945	3 June 1946	
Herman Arnold Zwijnenberg	VDB	20 November 1945	3 June 1946	
Herman Arnold Zwijnenberg	PvdA	20 November 1945	3 June 1946	

== See also ==
- List of candidates in the 1937 Dutch general election

== Sources ==
- Duynstee, F.J.F.M.; Bosmans, J. (1977). Het kabinet Schermerhorn Drees 1945'1946. Parlementaire geschiedenis van Nederland na 1945 (in Dutch). Assen/Amsterdam: Van Gorcum. hdl:2066/158343. ISBN 978-90-232-1412-0.
- Hoetink, Carla (2020). Terug naar het Binnenhof. De Tweede Kamer in ere hersteld (in Dutch). Amsterdam: Boom. ISBN 978-90-2443-512-8.
