= List of members of the House of Representatives of the Netherlands, 1948–1952 =

←	1946-1948	1952–1956	→
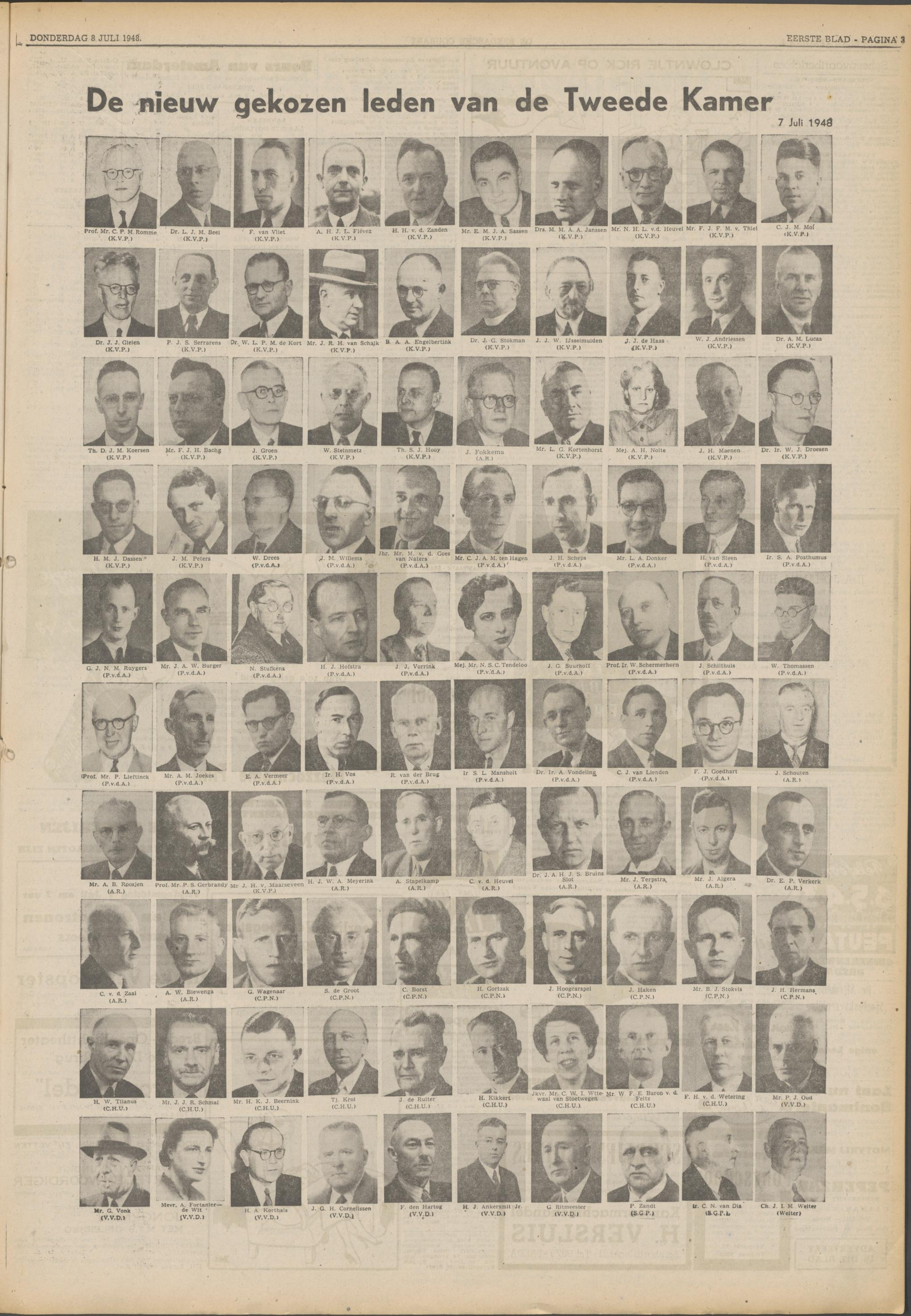
- Members of the House elected in 1948

Overview
- Legislative body: House of Representatives
- Meeting place: Binnenhof
- Term: 27 July 1948 – 14 July 1952
- Government: Drees–Van Schaik cabinet KVP (32) PvdA (27) CHU (9) VVD (8)
- Opposition: ARP (13) CPN (8) SGP (2) KNP (1)
- Members: 100
- Speaker of the House of Representatives: Rad Kortenhorst

Between 27 July 1948 and 14 July 1952, 116 individuals served as representatives in the House of Representatives, the 100-seat lower house of the States-General of the Netherlands. 100 representatives were elected in the 7 July 1948 general election and installed at the start of the term; 16 representatives were appointed as replacements when elected representatives resigned or died.

During the 1948 cabinet formation the Drees–Van Schaik cabinet was formed, consisting of Catholic People's Party (KVP, 32 seats), Labour Party (PvdA, 27 seats), Christian Historical Union (CHU, 9 seats) and People's Party for Freedom and Democracy (VVD, 8 seats). The opposition consisted of Anti-Revolutionary Party (ARP, 13 seats), Communist Party of the Netherlands (CPN, 8 seats), Reformed Political Party (SGP, 2 seats) and Catholic National Party (KNP, 1 seat).

== Members ==
Members of the House of Representatives of the Netherlands, 1948–1952
Name	Parliamentary group	Assumed office	Term end	Ref.
Jacob Algera	ARP	27 July 1948	14 July 1952	
Jan Andriessen	KVP	27 July 1948	14 July 1952	
Frans Bachg	KVP	27 July 1948	14 July 1952	
Louis Beel	KVP	27 July 1948	6 September 1948	
Henk Beernink	CHU	27 July 1948	14 July 1952	
Arend Biewenga	ARP	27 July 1948	14 July 1952	
Gerard Boekhoven	PvdA	19 December 1951	14 July 1952	
Henk van den Born	PvdA	27 July 1948	14 July 1952	
Cor Borst	CPN	27 July 1948	14 July 1952	
Rintje van der Brug	PvdA	27 July 1948	14 July 1952	
Sieuwert Bruins Slot	ARP	27 July 1948	14 July 1952	
Jaap Burger	PvdA	27 July 1948	14 July 1952	
Jo Cals	KVP	19 August 1948	14 March 1950	
Johan Cornelissen	VVD	27 July 1948	14 July 1952	
Huub Dassen	KVP	27 July 1948	14 July 1952	
Cor van Dis	SGP	27 July 1948	14 July 1952	
Leen Donker	PvdA	27 July 1948	14 July 1952	
Willem Drees	PvdA	27 July 1948	9 August 1948	
Wim Droesen	KVP	27 July 1948	14 July 1952	
Jan Emmens	PvdA	12 August 1948	14 July 1952	
Ben Engelbertink	KVP	27 July 1948	14 July 1952	
Willem François Ewoud van der Feltz	CHU	27 July 1948	14 July 1952	
Jan Fens	KVP	23 June 1949	14 July 1952	
Alexander Fiévez	KVP	27 July 1948	29 April 1949	
Jan Fokkema	ARP	27 July 1948	14 July 1952	
Jeanne Fortanier-de Wit	VVD	27 July 1948	14 July 1952	
Pieter Sjoerds Gerbrandy	ARP	27 July 1948	14 July 1952	
Jos Gielen	KVP	27 July 1948	14 November 1949	
Frans Goedhart	PvdA	27 July 1948	14 July 1952	
Marinus van der Goes van Naters	PvdA	27 July 1948	14 July 1952	
Henk Gortzak	CPN	27 July 1948	14 July 1952	
Theo de Graaf	KVP	21 September 1948	14 July 1952	
Jaap Groen	KVP	27 July 1948	14 July 1952	
Paul de Groot	CPN	27 July 1948	14 July 1952	
Johannes Jacobus de Haas	KVP	27 July 1948	14 July 1952	
Kees ten Hagen	PvdA	27 July 1948	14 July 1952	
Jan Haken	CPN	27 July 1948	14 July 1952	
Floor den Hartog	VVD	27 July 1948	14 July 1952	
Huub Hermans	CPN	13 August 1948	17 August 1951	
Chris van den Heuvel	ARP	27 July 1948	14 July 1952	
Nico van den Heuvel	KVP	27 July 1948	14 July 1952	
Henk Hofstra	PvdA	27 July 1948	14 July 1952	
Jan Hoogcarspel	CPN	27 July 1948	14 July 1952	
Theo Hooij	KVP	27 July 1948	14 July 1952	
J.J.W. IJsselmuiden	KVP	27 July 1948	28 February 1950	
Martin Janssen	KVP	27 July 1948	14 July 1952	
Dolf Joekes	PvdA	27 July 1948	6 August 1948	
Jacques de Kadt	PvdA	27 July 1948	14 July 1952	
Henk Kikkert	CHU	27 July 1948	14 July 1952	
Marga Klompé	KVP	12 August 1948	14 July 1952	
Theo Koersen	KVP	27 July 1948	14 July 1952	
Jo van Koeverden	KVP	28 March 1950	14 July 1952	
Wim de Kort	KVP	27 July 1948	14 July 1952	
Rad Kortenhorst	KVP	27 July 1948	14 July 1952	
Henk Korthals	VVD	27 July 1948	14 July 1952	
Tjeerd Krol	CHU	27 July 1948	14 July 1952	
Kees van Lienden	PvdA	27 July 1948	14 July 1952	
Rie Lips-Odinot	CPN	16 October 1951	14 July 1952	
Dirk de Loor	PvdA	12 August 1948	14 July 1952	
Anton Lucas	KVP	27 July 1948	14 July 1952	
Johannes Henricus van Maarseveen	KVP	27 July 1948	9 August 1948	
Jos Maenen	KVP	27 July 1948	14 July 1952	
Sicco Mansholt	PvdA	27 July 1948	9 August 1948	
Hendrik Johan Wilhelm Adriaan Meijerink	ARP	27 July 1948	14 July 1952	
Chris Mol	KVP	27 July 1948	14 July 1952	
Gerard Nederhorst	PvdA	21 December 1948	14 July 1952	
Agnes Nolte	KVP	27 July 1948	14 July 1952	
Pieter Oud	VVD	27 July 1948	14 July 1952	
Jan Peters	KVP	27 July 1948	14 July 1952	
Kees van der Ploeg	KVP	2 November 1949	14 July 1952	
Ans Ploeg-Ploeg	PvdA	16 October 1951	14 July 1952	
Siep Posthumus	PvdA	27 July 1948	14 July 1952	
Govert Ritmeester	VVD	27 July 1948	14 July 1952	
Carl Romme	KVP	27 July 1948	14 July 1952	
Eugène Roolvink	KVP	2 March 1950	14 July 1952	
Anton Roosjen	ARP	27 July 1948	14 July 1952	
Jo de Ruiter	CHU	27 July 1948	14 July 1952	
Geert Ruygers	PvdA	27 July 1948	14 July 1952	
Maan Sassen	KVP	27 July 1948	6 August 1948	
Josef van Schaik	KVP	27 July 1948	6 August 1948	
Johan Scheps	PvdA	27 July 1948	14 July 1952	
Willem Schermerhorn	PvdA	27 July 1948	17 September 1951	
Jan Schilthuis	PvdA	27 July 1948	14 July 1952	
Jan Schmal	CHU	27 July 1948	14 July 1952	
Jan Schouten	ARP	27 July 1948	14 July 1952	
Jos Serrarens	KVP	12 August 1948	14 July 1952	
Harm van Sleen	PvdA	27 July 1948	14 July 1952	
Antoon Stapelkamp	ARP	27 July 1948	14 July 1952	
Willem Steinmetz	KVP	27 July 1948	12 September 1949	
Jacobus Gerardus Stokman	KVP	12 August 1948	14 July 1952	
Benno Stokvis	CPN	27 July 1948	14 July 1952	
Nico Stufkens	PvdA	27 July 1948	14 July 1952	
Ko Suurhoff	PvdA	27 July 1948	14 July 1952	
Corry Tendeloo	PvdA	27 July 1948	14 July 1952	
Jan Terpstra	ARP	27 July 1948	14 July 1952	
Frans-Joseph van Thiel	KVP	27 July 1948	14 July 1952	
Hendrik Tilanus	CHU	27 July 1948	14 July 1952	
Jan Tuin	PvdA	12 August 1948	30 September 1951	
Bernard Verhoeven	KVP	1 December 1949	14 July 1952	
Frans van Vliet	KVP	27 July 1948	14 July 1952	
Martien van der Weijden	KVP	13 August 1948	14 July 1952	
Ep Verkerk	ARP	27 July 1948	14 July 1952	
Evert Vermeer	PvdA	27 July 1948	14 July 1952	
Anne Vondeling	PvdA	27 July 1948	14 July 1952	
Gijsbertus Vonk	VVD	27 July 1948	14 July 1952	
Koos Vorrink	PvdA	27 July 1948	14 July 1952	
Hein Vos	PvdA	27 July 1948	15 December 1948	
Gerben Wagenaar	CPN	27 July 1948	14 July 1952	
Charles Welter	KNP	27 July 1948	14 July 1952	
Frits van de Wetering	CHU	27 July 1948	14 July 1952	
Joan Willems	PvdA	27 July 1948	14 July 1952	
Freule Wttewaall van Stoetwegen	CHU	27 July 1948	14 July 1952	
Cornelis van der Zaal	ARP	27 July 1948	14 July 1952	
Harrie van der Zanden	KVP	27 July 1948	14 July 1952	
Pieter Zandt	SGP	27 July 1948	14 July 1952	
Roelof Zegering Hadders	VVD	27 July 1948	14 July 1952	
