= List of members of the House of Representatives of the Netherlands for the Free-thinking Democratic League =

The Free-thinking Democratic League (VDB) was represented in the Dutch House of Representatives from 1901 until its merger into the Labour Party (PvdA) in 1946. This is a list of members of the House of Representatives for the VDB.

== List ==
List of members of the House of Representatives of the Netherlands for the Free-thinking Democratic League
Member	Term start	Term end	Ref.
Simon Jakob Levie van Aalten	15 September 1925	16 July 1928	
Betsy Bakker-Nort	22 July 1922	5 January 1942	
Eltjo van Beresteyn	20 June 1916	3 January 1922	
Zadok van den Bergh	19 September 1905	20 September 1909	
Klaas Bijlsma	6 December 1938	8 February 1946	
Dirk Bos	17 September 1901	5 May 1916	
Mozes Meijer Cohen	15 September 1936	12 March 1940	
Conrad Theodor van Deventer	19 September 1905	20 September 1909	
Conrad Theodor van Deventer	16 September 1913	26 September 1915	
Hendrik Lodewijk Drucker	17 March 1901	30 June 1913	
Fekko Ebel Hajo Ebels	22 July 1922	8 February 1946	
Eduard Fokker	17 March 1901	28 February 1903	
Mien van Itallie-Van Embden	18 September 1928	8 May 1933	
Dolf Joekes	15 September 1925	8 February 1946	
Theo Ketelaar	17 March 1901	26 June 1936	
Dirk Kooiman	11 June 1933	7 June 1937	
Willem Otto Adriaan Koster	9 November 1915	16 September 1918	
Joseph Limburg	19 September 1905	16 September 1918	
Henri Marchant	17 March 1901	26 May 1933	
Pieter Rudolf Mees	19 September 1905	20 September 1909	
Piet Nolting	17 March 1901	20 September 1909	
Pieter Oud	28 June 1917	25 May 1933	
Pieter Oud	8 June 1937	8 November 1938	
Jacobus Marinus Pijnacker Hordijk	17 March 1901	18 September 1905	
Eduard Ellis van Raalte	17 March 1901	17 August 1905	
Leendert Nicolaas Roodenburg	16 September 1913	16 September 1918	
Jan Schilthuis	11 June 1933	8 February 1946	
Eerke Albert Smidt	17 September 1901	15 September 1913	
Edsge Marten Teenstra	21 September 1909	7 February 1922	
Corry Tendeloo	20 November 1945	8 February 1946	
Willem Treub	8 November 1904	29 August 1913	
George Auguste Vorsterman van Oyen	21 September 1909	15 September 1913	
Herman Arnold Zwijnenberg	9 May 1940	8 February 1946	
