= List of parliamentary leaders of the People's Party for Freedom and Democracy in the House of Representatives =

This is a list of parliamentary leaders of the Dutch political party People's Party for Freedom and Democracy (VVD) in the House of Representatives.

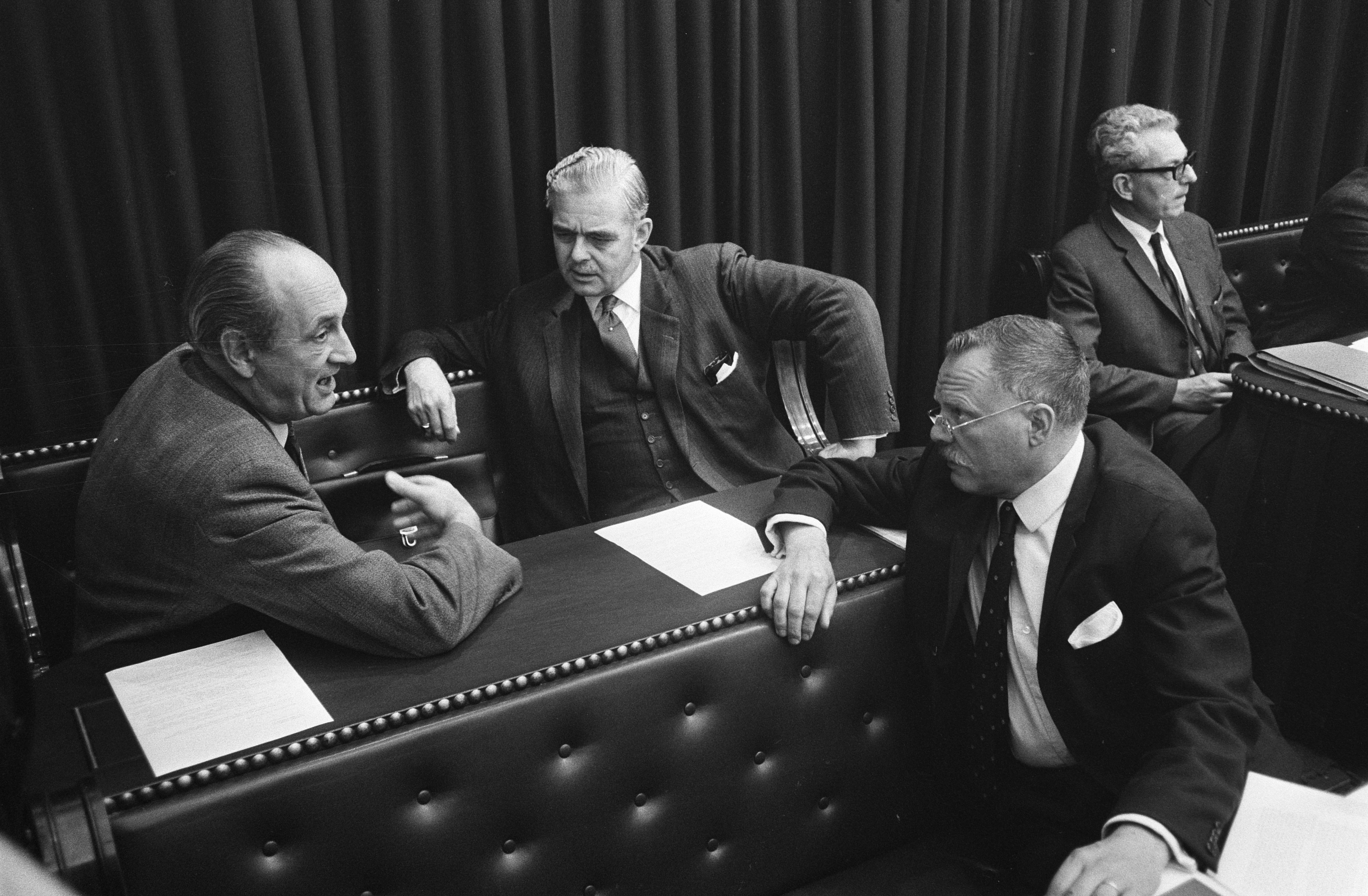
Edzo Toxopeus and Molly Geertsema on 14 October 1969.

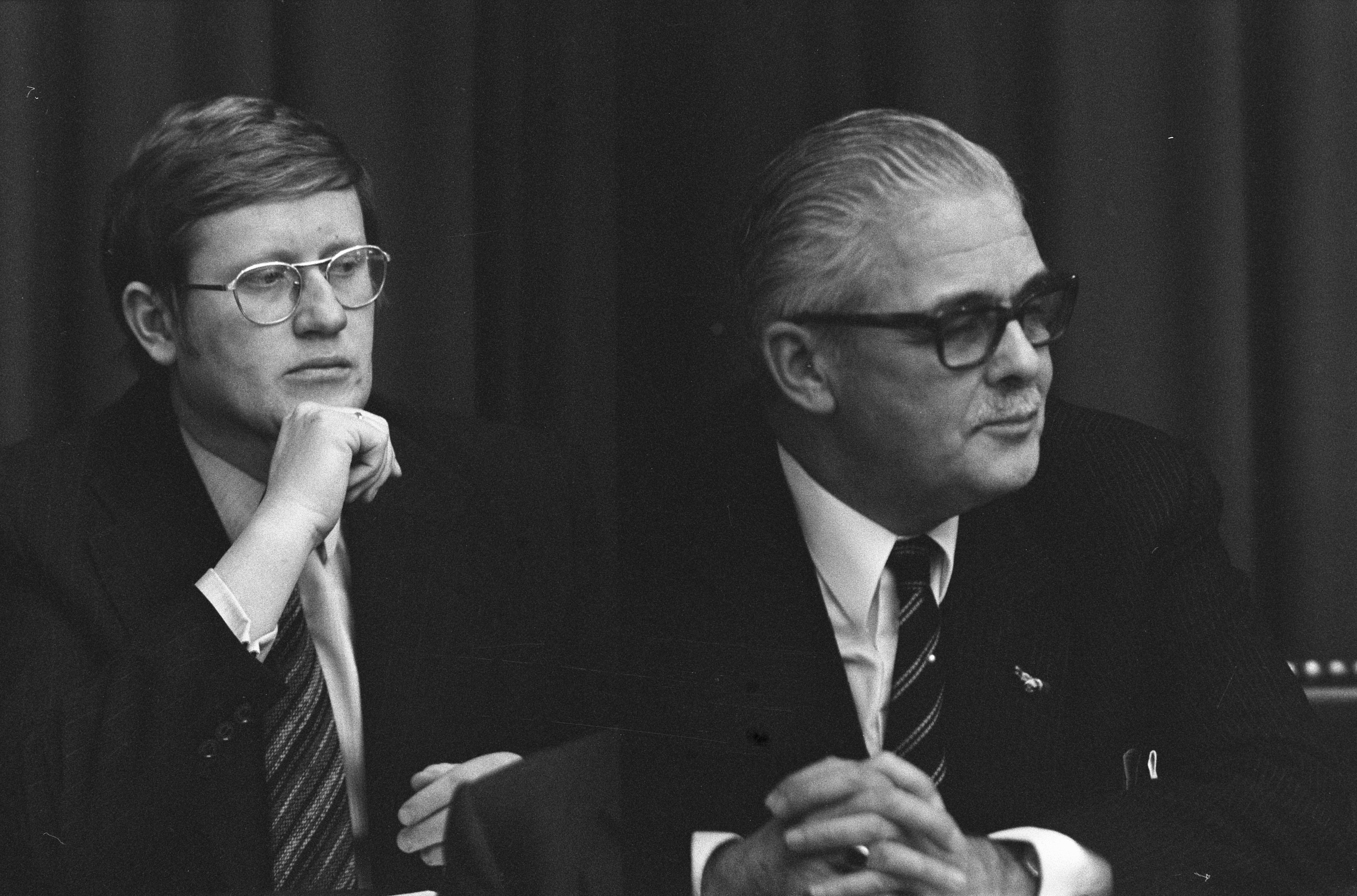
Hans Wiegel and Molly Geertsema on 8 November 1973.

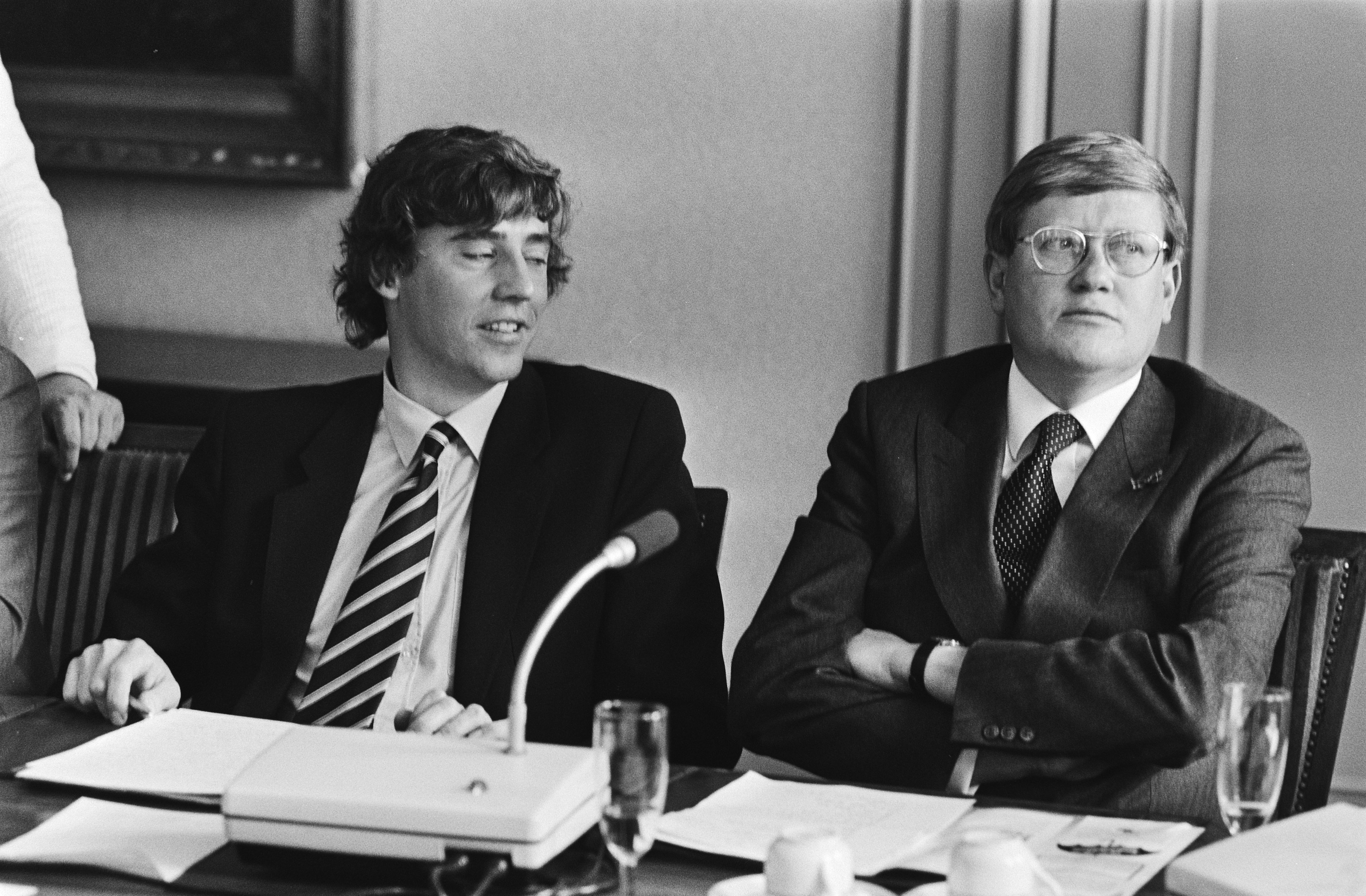
Ed Nijpels and Hans Wiegel on 20 April 1982.

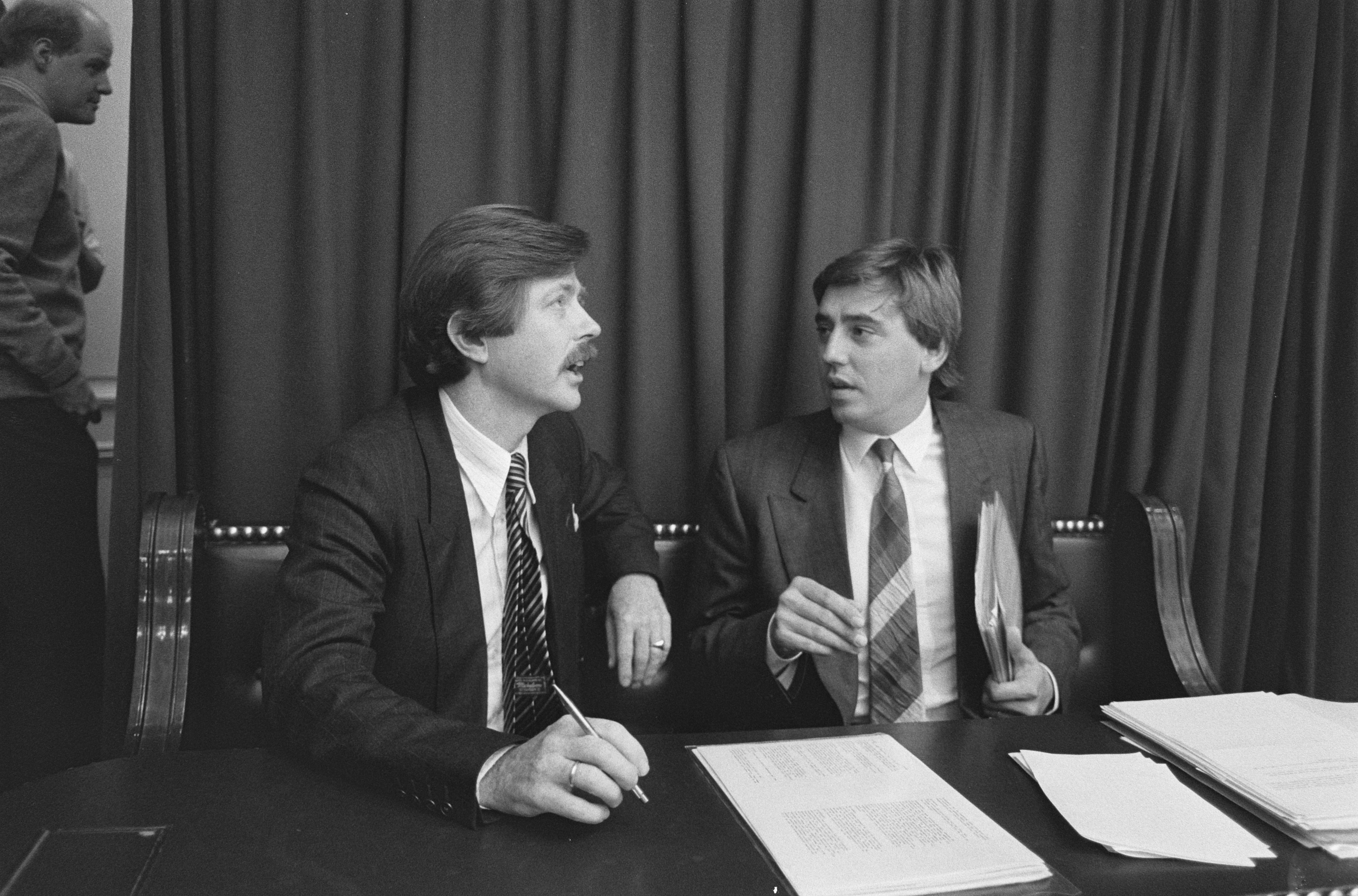
Joris Voorhoeve and Ed Nijpels on 9 September 1986.

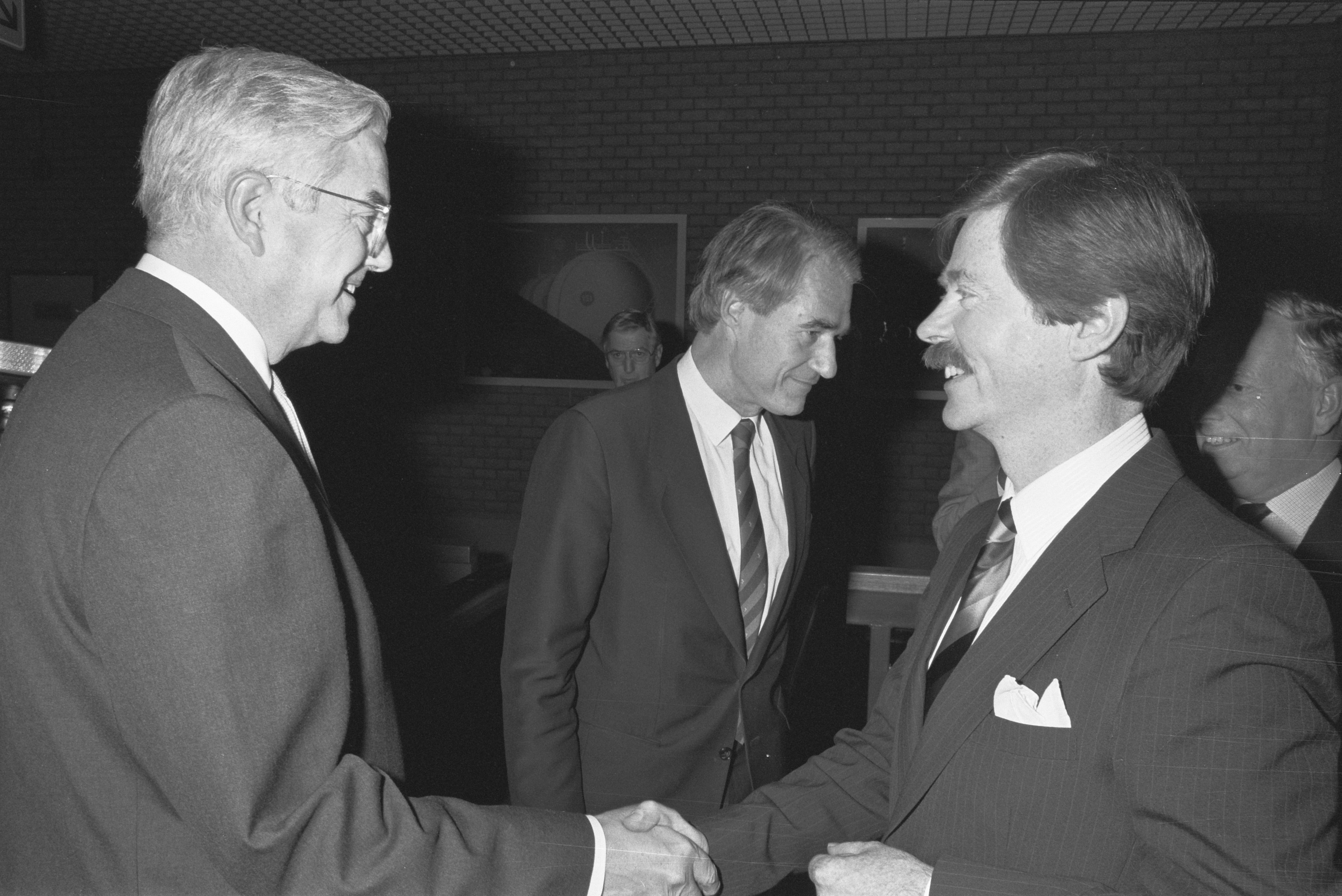
Frits Bolkestein and Joris Voorhoeve on 24 September 1988.

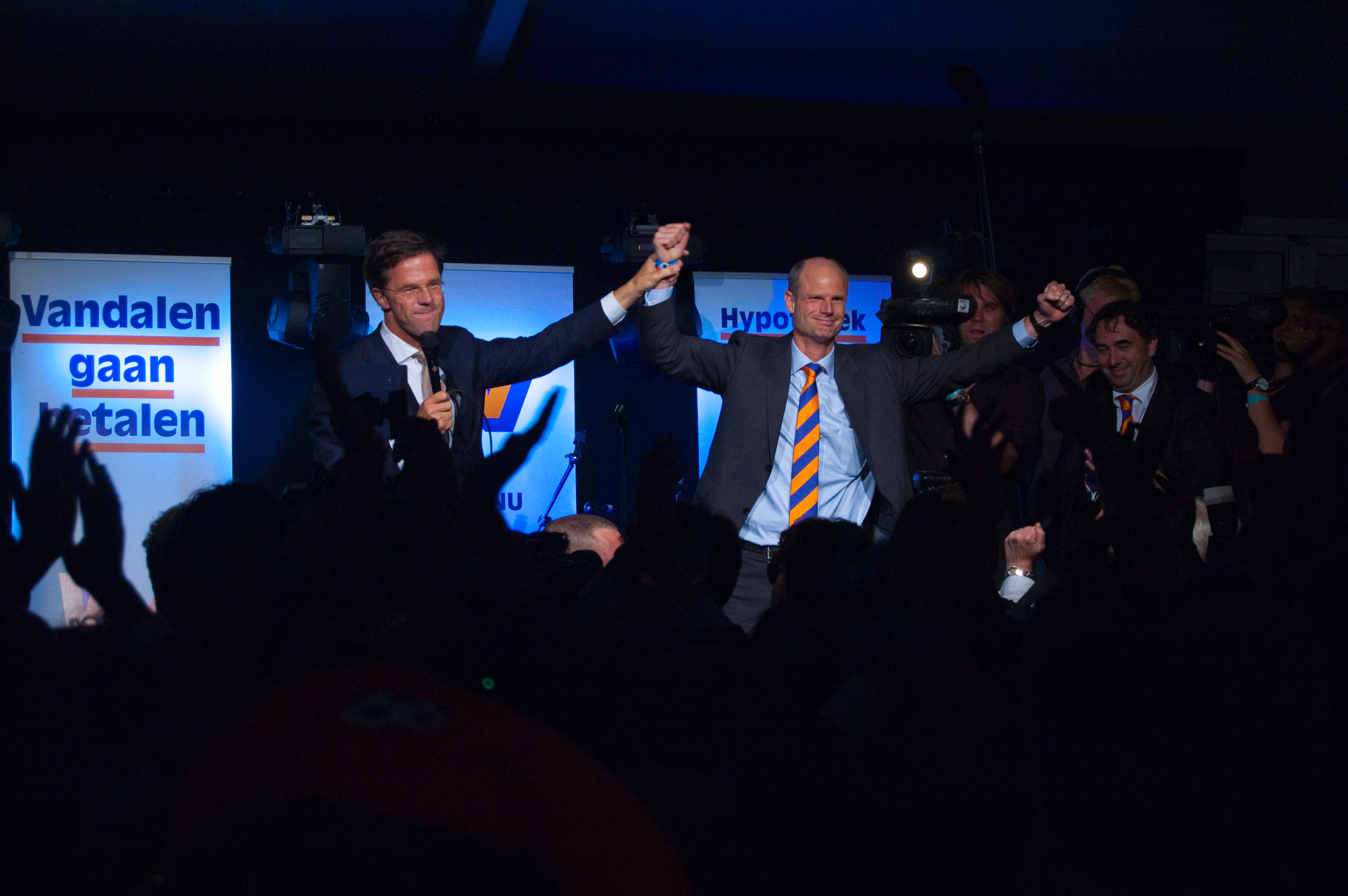
Mark Rutte and Stef Blok on 10 June 2010.

Parliamentary leader		Term of office	Legislative term
Pieter Oud	Pieter Oud (1886–1968)	27 July 1948 – 16 May 1963 (14 years, 293 days)	1948–1952; 1952–1956; 1956–1959; 1959–1963
Edzo Toxopeus	Edzo Toxopeus (1918–2009)	16 May 1963 – 24 July 1963 (69 days)	1963–1967
Molly Geertsema	Molly Geertsema (1918–1991)	24 July 1963 – 12 March 1966 (2 years, 231 days)	1963–1967
Edzo Toxopeus	Edzo Toxopeus (1918–2009)	12 March 1966 – 1 October 1969 (3 years, 203 days)	1963–1967
Edzo Toxopeus	Edzo Toxopeus (1918–2009)	12 March 1966 – 1 October 1969 (3 years, 203 days)	1967–1971
Molly Geertsema	Molly Geertsema (1918–1991)	1 October 1969 – 6 July 1971 (1 year, 278 days)	1967–1971
Molly Geertsema	Molly Geertsema (1918–1991)	1 October 1969 – 6 July 1971 (1 year, 278 days)	1971–1972
Hans Wiegel	Hans Wiegel (1941–2025)	20 July 1971 – 19 December 1977 (6 years, 152 days)	1971–1972
Hans Wiegel	Hans Wiegel (1941–2025)	20 July 1971 – 19 December 1977 (6 years, 152 days)	1972–1977
Hans Wiegel	Hans Wiegel (1941–2025)	20 July 1971 – 19 December 1977 (6 years, 152 days)	1977–1981
Koos Rietkerk	Koos Rietkerk (1927–1986)	19 December 1977 – 25 August 1981 (3 years, 249 days)	1977–1981
Hans Wiegel	Hans Wiegel (1941–2025)	25 August 1981 – 20 April 1982 (238 days)	1981–1982
Ed Nijpels	Ed Nijpels (born 1950)	20 April 1982 – 9 July 1986 (4 years, 80 days)	1981–1982
Ed Nijpels	Ed Nijpels (born 1950)	20 April 1982 – 9 July 1986 (4 years, 80 days)	1982–1986
Ed Nijpels	Ed Nijpels (born 1950)	20 April 1982 – 9 July 1986 (4 years, 80 days)	1986–1989
Joris Voorhoeve	Joris Voorhoeve (born 1945)	9 July 1986 – 30 April 1990 (3 years, 295 days)	1986–1989
Joris Voorhoeve	Joris Voorhoeve (born 1945)	9 July 1986 – 30 April 1990 (3 years, 295 days)	1989–1994
Frits Bolkestein	Frits Bolkestein (1933–2025)	30 April 1990 – 30 July 1998 (8 years, 91 days)	1989–1994
Frits Bolkestein	Frits Bolkestein (1933–2025)	30 April 1990 – 30 July 1998 (8 years, 91 days)	1994–1998
Frits Bolkestein	Frits Bolkestein (1933–2025)	30 April 1990 – 30 July 1998 (8 years, 91 days)	1998–2002
Hans Dijkstal	Hans Dijkstal (1943–2010)	30 July 1998 – 23 May 2002 (3 years, 297 days)	1998–2002
Gerrit Zalm	Gerrit Zalm (born 1952)	23 May 2002 – 27 May 2003 (1 year, 4 days)	2002–2003
Gerrit Zalm	Gerrit Zalm (born 1952)	23 May 2002 – 27 May 2003 (1 year, 4 days)	2003–2006
Jozias van Aartsen	Jozias van Aartsen (born 1947)	27 May 2003 – 8 March 2006 (2 years, 285 days)	2003–2006
Willibrord van Beek	Willibrord van Beek (born 1949)	8 March 2006 – 29 June 2006 (113 days)	2003–2006
Mark Rutte	Mark Rutte (born 1967)	29 June 2006 – 8 October 2010 (4 years, 214 days)	2003–2006
Mark Rutte	Mark Rutte (born 1967)	29 June 2006 – 8 October 2010 (4 years, 214 days)	2006–2010
Mark Rutte	Mark Rutte (born 1967)	29 June 2006 – 8 October 2010 (4 years, 214 days)	2010–2012
Stef Blok	Stef Blok (born 1964)	8 October 2010 – 20 September 2012 (1 year, 348 days)	2010–2012
Mark Rutte	Mark Rutte (born 1967)	20 September 2012 – 1 November 2012 (42 days)	2012–2017
Halbe Zijlstra	Halbe Zijlstra (born 1969)	1 November 2012 – 23 March 2017 (4 years, 142 days)	2012–2017
Mark Rutte	Mark Rutte (born 1967)	23 March 2017 – 13 October 2017 (204 days)	2017–2021
Halbe Zijlstra	Halbe Zijlstra (born 1969)	13 October 2017 – 25 October 2017 (12 days)	2017–2021
Klaas Dijkhoff	Klaas Dijkhoff (born 1981)	25 October 2017 – 31 March 2021 (3 years, 157 days)	2017–2021
Mark Rutte	Mark Rutte (born 1967)	31 March 2021 – 10 January 2022 (285 days)	2021–2023
Sophie Hermans	Sophie Hermans (born 1981)	10 January 2022 – 6 December 2023 (1 year, 330 days)	2021–2023
Dilan Yeşilgöz	Dilan Yeşilgöz (born 1977)	6 December 2023 – Incumbent (2 years, 90 days)	2023–2025
