= Jaap le Poole =

Dutch politician (1914–1993)

Member of the House of Representatives
- In office 20 November 1945 – 3 June 1946
- In office 5 November 1947 – 26 July 1948

Personal details
- Born: 21 May 1914 Leiden, Netherlands
- Died: 16 October 1993 (aged 79) Deventer, Netherlands
- Party: PvdA (1946-1948, 1956-1980s)
- Other political affiliations: SDAP (until 1946)

Jacob (Jaap) le Poole (21 May 1914 – 16 October 1993) was a member of the Dutch resistance during the Second World War and a politician for the Labour Party (PvdA).

== Biography ==
During the Second World War, Le Poole became member of the spy group Dienst Wim, of which he became the leader in 1943. Near the end of the war, he became one of the secretaries of the College van Vertrouwensmannen.

In November 1945, he was appointed to the Provisional House of Representatives on behalf of the Labour Party (PvdA). He was not re-elected in the 1946 general election, but returned to the House of Representatives in November 1947 as replacement. He did not return after the 1948 general election. He left the party later that year, because he opposed Operation Kraai in Indonesia.

He became director of the Foundation for the Supervision of Political Offenders. In that role, he was involved, among other things, with the release of the Breda Four.
