= Steven Edzo Broeils Bierema =

Dutch politician (1884-1950)

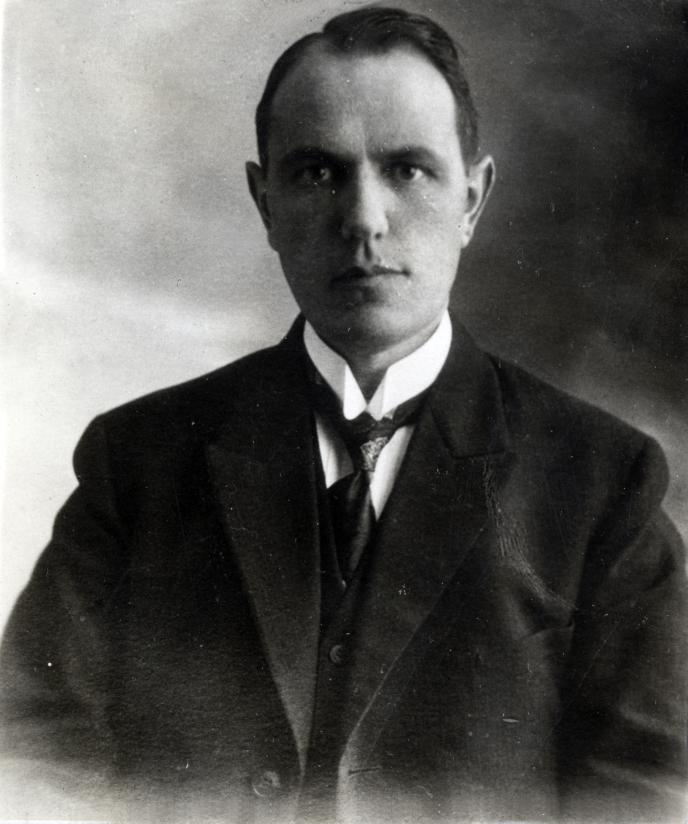
- Steven Edzo Broeils Bierema

Member of the House of Representatives
- In office 25 July 1922 – 15 September 1925
- In office 15 February 1927 – 27 juli 1948

Member of the Senate
- In office 27 juli 1948 – 14 February 1950

Personal details
- Born: 12 November 1884 Usquert, Netherlands
- Died: 14 February 1950 (aged 65) Usquert, Netherlands
- Party: LSP (until 1946); PvdV (1946-1948); VVD (1948-1950)
- Spouse: Hendrika Catharina Westerhuis (m. 1915)
- Children: 3
- Education: Leipzig University

Steven Edzo Broeils Bierema (12 November 1884 - 14 February 1950) was a Dutch farmer and politician. He was a member of the House of Representatives from 1922 to 1925 and 1927 to 1948 for the Liberal State Party and its successor the Freedom Party (PvdV), serving as the LSP and PvdV's parliamentary leader from 1933 to 1948. He then served as a member of the Senate for the People's Party for Freedom and Democracy (VVD) until his death in 1950.

== Early life ==
Steven Edzo Broeils Bierema was born on 12 November 1884 in Usquert, Groningen to Peter Broeils Bierema, a wealthy farmer and local politician. After completing his secondary education in the city of Groningen, he studied at several German universities, obtaining his doctorate from Leipzig University in 1909. He returned to Usquert, where he took up farming after having traveled to the United States for a study trip and engaged in various business ventures, helping to found a cardboard factory in Hoogkerk. He was also a member of a commission to establish an agrarian research station on sandy soil in the province of Groningen.

== Political career ==
Bierema began his political career by being elected to the municipal council of Usquert in 1918, serving in this position until 1922. In the 1922 Dutch general election, he was first elected to the House of Representatives, representing the Liberal State Party (LSP). As an MP, he mainly focused on agricultural and economic issues. During the Great Depression, Bierema advocated for state support for farmers, against the opposition of many of his fellow liberals.

In 1933, Bierema became the parliamentary leader of the LSP in the House of Representatives. He would remain in this position for the next fifteen years, becoming the parliamentary leader for the Freedom Party (PvdV) after its formation in 1946 as well. In 1948, he resigned to take up a seat in the Senate for the newly formed People's Party for Freedom and Democracy.

Bierema died on 14 February 1950 in Usquert.
