= Corry Tendeloo =

Dutch lawyer, feminist, and politician (1897–1956)

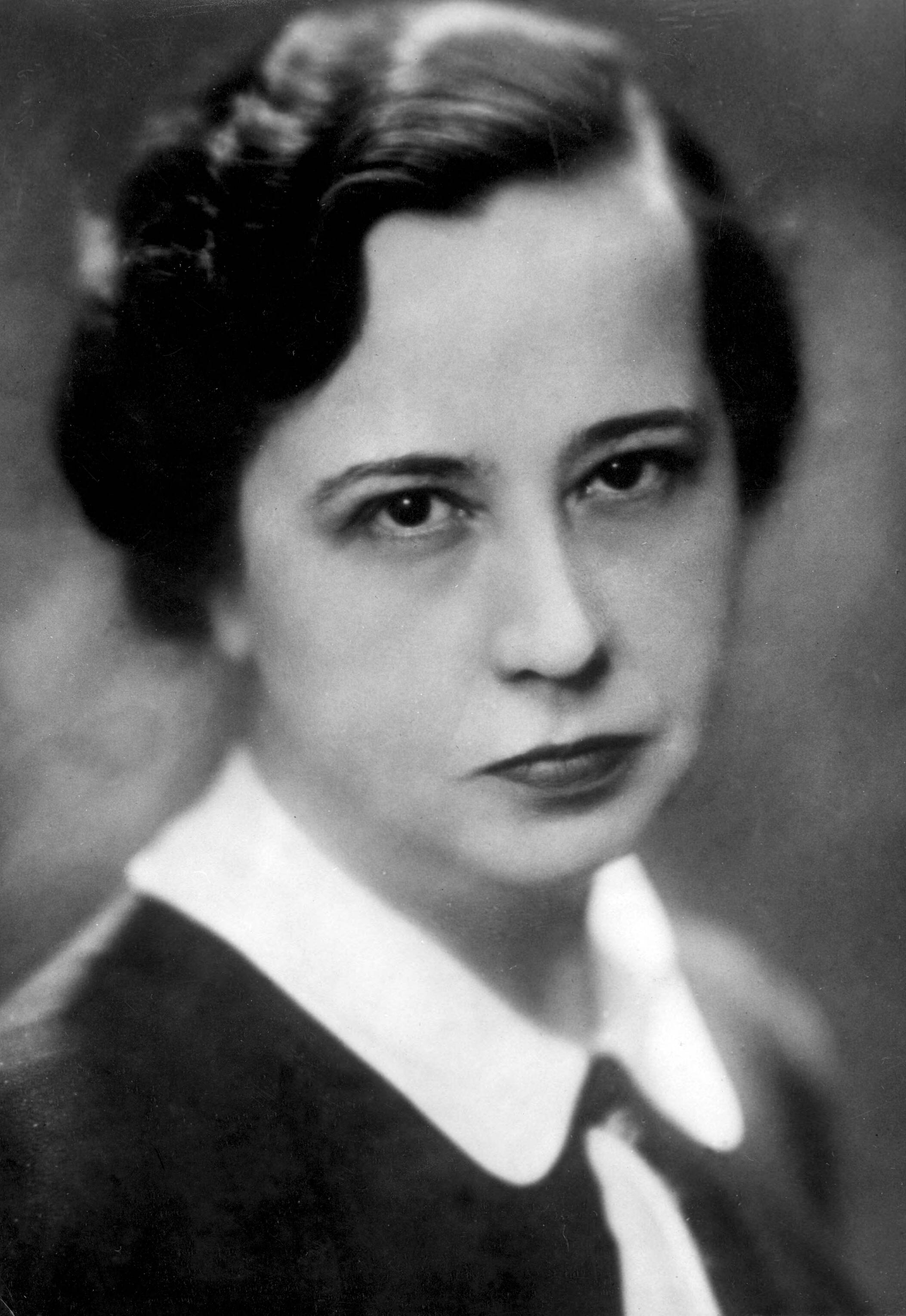
- Tendeloo, c. 1938

Member of the House of Representatives
- In office 20 November 1945 – 18 October 1956

Member of the Amsterdam Municipal Council
- In office 1938–1946

Personal details
- Born: Nancy Sophie Cornélie Tendeloo; 3 September 1897 Tebing Tinggi, Sumatra, Dutch East Indies
- Died: 18 October 1956 (aged 59) Wassenaar, Netherlands
- Party: VDB (1930s–1946); PvdA (1946–1956)
- Education: Utrecht University

Nancy Sophie Cornélie "Corry" Tendeloo (3 September 1897 – 18 October 1956) was a Dutch lawyer, feminist, and politician who served in the House of Representatives for the Free-thinking Democratic League (VDB) from 1945 until 1946 and then for the newly-formed Labour Party (PvdA) until her death in 1956. Born in the Dutch East Indies, Tendeloo studied law at Utrecht University, during which time she made contact with people within the women's rights movement. She became politically active in the 1930's and was elected to the Amsterdam City Council for the VDB in 1938. After World War II, Tendeloo was appointed a member of the Provisional House of Representatives, formed to rebuild the country and organise elections. In 1946, the VDB merged with other parties into the PvdA, which Tendeloo represented in parliament. She sat on two select committees and spoke in favour of women's rights issues.

She helped secure universal suffrage for the Dutch colonies Suriname and Curaçao in 1948. In early 1955, she successfully made the case for equal pay and later that year put forward a motion to abolish the ban on state employment for married women. The next year she was instrumental in introducing legislation that would start to end the Dutch version of couverture, a 19th-century legal doctrine according to which married women were deemed incompetent to act on their own behalf and were stopped from performing acts such as opening a bank account without the permission of their husband. Tendeloo died in October 1956, before any of the women's rights issues she fought for became law. She was largely forgotten after her death, even during the second wave of feminism in the 1960s and 1970s. In the 21st century efforts have been made to make her achievements better known.

== Early life and career ==
Nancy Sophie Cornélie "Corry" Tendeloo was born on 3 September 1897 in Tebing Tinggi, on Sumatra, part of the Dutch East Indies. Her mother, Jeanne Cornélie Stamm'ler came from a well-to-do family, as did her father, a high-ranking civil servant named Henri Tendeloo. When she was five years old, her father died and her mother moved with her three children to the Netherlands. Corry attended primary school in Amersfoort and secondary school in Leiden. In 1916, the family moved to Utrecht. Two years later she earned an English-teaching diploma and started teaching at a local secondary school, a job she held until 1921. She also became a certified English translator. In 1919, Tendeloo began reading law at Utrecht University, graduating in 1924. As a student she met women's rights activists, and represented the Utrecht Women's Student Association in the Dutch Women's Council.

During her student days, the women's movement in the Netherlands was waning. The first wave of feminism in the Netherlands focused on the right of women to vote and stand for parliament. After these demands became law in 1919, a smaller number of feminists continued the fight for equality in other aspects of life. In 1924, Tendeloo joined the law firm Pieren & Folkers and in 1927, she began to practise as an independent lawyer in Amsterdam, specialising in women's issues, including divorce. She also encountered cases involving women's inequalities while working pro bono (without pay) for Vereniging Ons Huis, an association to promote social housing. She volunteered as secretary for the Dutch Women's Club, a position she held until 1937. She lived in the housing cooperative The New House, an apartment complex for unmarried women in Amsterdam, also serving as its president.

== Early political career ==
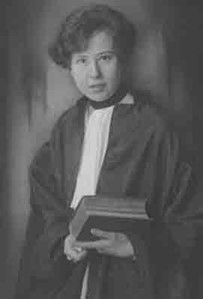
Tendeloo in 1926

In the 1930s, Tendeloo became politically active. She joined the Free-thinking Democratic League (VDB), a political party founded in 1901 on a platform emphasising universal suffrage. She also joined the Association of Women with Higher Education (VVAO) and was appointed to a leadership role in 1933. The VVAO's central position was that women could lead a fulfilling life through academic achievement and without needing to marry. The organisation criticised state restrictions on married women's right to seek employment. Tendeloo also joined the Association for Women's Interests and Equal Citizenship (VVGS) and became president of its youth committee. Both organisations were founded to promote equal rights for women and for women's participation in public life and the progress of society; they promoted change in three stages: awareness, legal equality, and practical equality.

As president of the VVGS youth committee Tendeloo and other feminists such as Willemijn Posthumus-van der Goot organised protests across the country in 1937, when parliament discussed Minister Carl Romme's draft law to ban married women from paid employment. Because of Tendeloo's role in the protests, VDB nominated her as candidate in the elections for Provincial Council of North Holland. Although she did not win a seat, her performance earned her a place on the candidate list in the Amsterdam City Council elections. Tendeloo was elected to the Amsterdam City Council in 1938 and remained active in the VVGS, campaigning for men to see women as equals in the workforce who could contribute to the progress of society, not just family life. She said that once society's view of women changed, the discriminating, outdated laws would be rewritten. In 1941, City Council proceedings were suspended by the German occupation regime during World War II. When Jewish council members were dismissed as part of the Holocaust, she expressed sympathy.

== House of Representatives ==
After the war, Tendeloo returned to the Amsterdam City Council and in November 1945 was appointed to the House of Representatives for the VDB in the national emergency parliament, formed to rebuild the country and organise elections. A committee appointed members to replace those who had stepped down or been killed during the war. Tendeloo was chosen to take the seat of Betsy Bakker-Nort, a feminist she admired who had been elected member of parliament in 1922 after campaigning for women's suffrage, and who did not return to parliament after having been interned in Nazi concentration camps. Tendeloo continued her legal practice while serving on the City Council and in national politics. She resigned from the Amsterdam City Council in September 1946. Following the merger of the VDB with the Social Democratic Workers' Party (SDAP) and the Christian Democratic Union (CDU) in 1946, her membership transferred automatically to the newly formed Labour Party (PvdA). On the list of PvdA candidates for the 1946 elections she was ranked third out of five for the former VDB party. The PvdA won 29 of the 100 seats, making them the second biggest party after the Catholic People's Party (KVP), with whom they formed a coalition government. Tendeloo was the only female representative of the PvdA. Soon after the elections, she joined the PvdA commission to draft a manifesto for the newly formed party. Tendeloo started a regular column called "Parlementaria" in the monthly magazine of the VVGS, writing about political news events; she continued to do so until April 1956.

In 1946, Tendeloo criticised the Ministry of Social Affairs for commissioning research into the shortage of female workers, arguing that before the war the government had actively dissuaded women from taking part in the workforce on the grounds that a women's place was at home. Tendeloo concluded that the government changed its stance on women in the workplace based on the needs of the labour market. In 1947, Tendeloo unsuccessfully tried to stop a ministerial ruling put forward by Minister of Internal Affairs Louis Beel, asking ministries to restrict the hiring of married women. In 1948, she was successful, together with Wim de Kort, in securing universal suffrage for Suriname and Curaçao by having the word "male" struck from the bill for the new charter for the Dutch colonies. In 1952, she gave up her legal work and was absent from parliament for almost a year after she was diagnosed with breast cancer. In February 1953, she was appointed president of the House of Representatives' Justice Budget Committee, where she remained until September. She served as deputy chair of the Justice Select Committee until October 1956, working on a new civil code. To highlight the difference in opportunities for men and women, she applied, using a pseudonym, to the tax academy in Rotterdam, which was then only open to men. The following discussion in the media, where the applicant was termed 'Miss X', and in parliament, resulted in the government opening up the tax academy to women in 1954. That same year, Tendeloo was granted a Knighthood in the Order of the Netherlands Lion.

=== Equal pay debates ===
In March 1955, Tendeloo debated equal pay in the House of Representatives. In a column in the newspaper Het Vrije Volk, she argued that the women's rights movement had begun advocating equal pay in 1898 and made their case at the League of Nations, the United Nations and ultimately the International Labour Organization, which in 1951 adopted the Equal Remuneration Convention. The Dutch government accepted equal pay in principle but opposed ratification and execution on the grounds that the pay gap of 30 per cent should be closed over time and not at once. Tendeloo argued that the convention did not require an immediate closure of the pay gap. She and three other female members agreed with the government that introduction should be gradual; Tendeloo suggested over eight years. The government also claimed it was up to the private sector to prioritise equal pay; Tendeloo argued that anything involving women's rights would end up at the bottom of the priority list. When the government said that equal pay would harm the economy, Tendeloo pointed out that if ever there was a time to deal with the cost of social justice, it was while the economy was growing. Tendeloo submitted a motion, with six others, calling on the government to ratify and execute the Equal Remuneration Convention as quickly as possible. The motion passed with 47 votes in favour and 39 against, with crucial votes in favour coming from freule Wttewaall van Stoetwegen's party, the Christian Historical Union (CHU). The government did not act upon it.

=== Motion of Tendeloo ===
In September 1955, Tendeloo moved the "Motie Tendeloo" ("Motion Tendeloo") for the end of mandatory dismissal of female civil servants once they married. Since 1924, a law banned married women from working for the state, partly on the grounds that their place was with their family, and partly to help save money during the Great Depression. In the 1930s, the Hendrik Colijn government wrote proposals to ban married women from working in the private sector as well, but these were not implemented. During and after World War II, with great labour shortages, the law was circumvented by offering dismissed married women a temporary contract. In 1950, fewer than 2 per cent of married women worked.

Tendeloo raised the issue of inequality in the workplace throughout her tenure in parliament; in September 1955 she forced an interpellation during a discussion about a proposed law for teachers. Tendeloo argued that the government's position on maintaining mandatory dismissal of married teachers, albeit with more exemptions than before, was out of touch with society. Her main argument was that it should be a decision for the married couple, adding that it was "such a restriction on personal freedom that I find it undemocratic". She ended her speech urging the government to revise its position with the advice "a fault confessed is a fault redressed". The government argued that it seemed physically and psychologically irresponsible for a woman to combine family with work. Disappointed by this reply, Tendeloo made her motion, together with Jeanne Fortanier-de Wit.

Following days of debate, during which members of faith-based parties argued that removing the ban would jeopardise the well-being of families, the Motion Tendeloo was put up for a vote on 22 September 1955. The two-line motion stated that the House was of the opinion that the state should not ban the employment of married women, bar cases of abuse, and invited the government to revise all laws against their employment. Beel urged the House not to accept the motion, but said it was not unacceptable. The motion passed with 46 votes in favour and 44 against, largely along party lines: all members of the PvdA, Communist Party of the Netherlands (CPN), and People's Party for Freedom and Democracy (VVD) voted in favour. All ten female representatives voted in favour and of the faith-based parties, four men voted in favour. Immediately following the announcement of the vote tallies, Beel congratulated Tendeloo. The newspapers reported the next day that if ten members who had been absent had voted, the motion would still have passed, by a 52–48 vote, based on the absentees' expressed opinions.

=== Ending Courveture ===
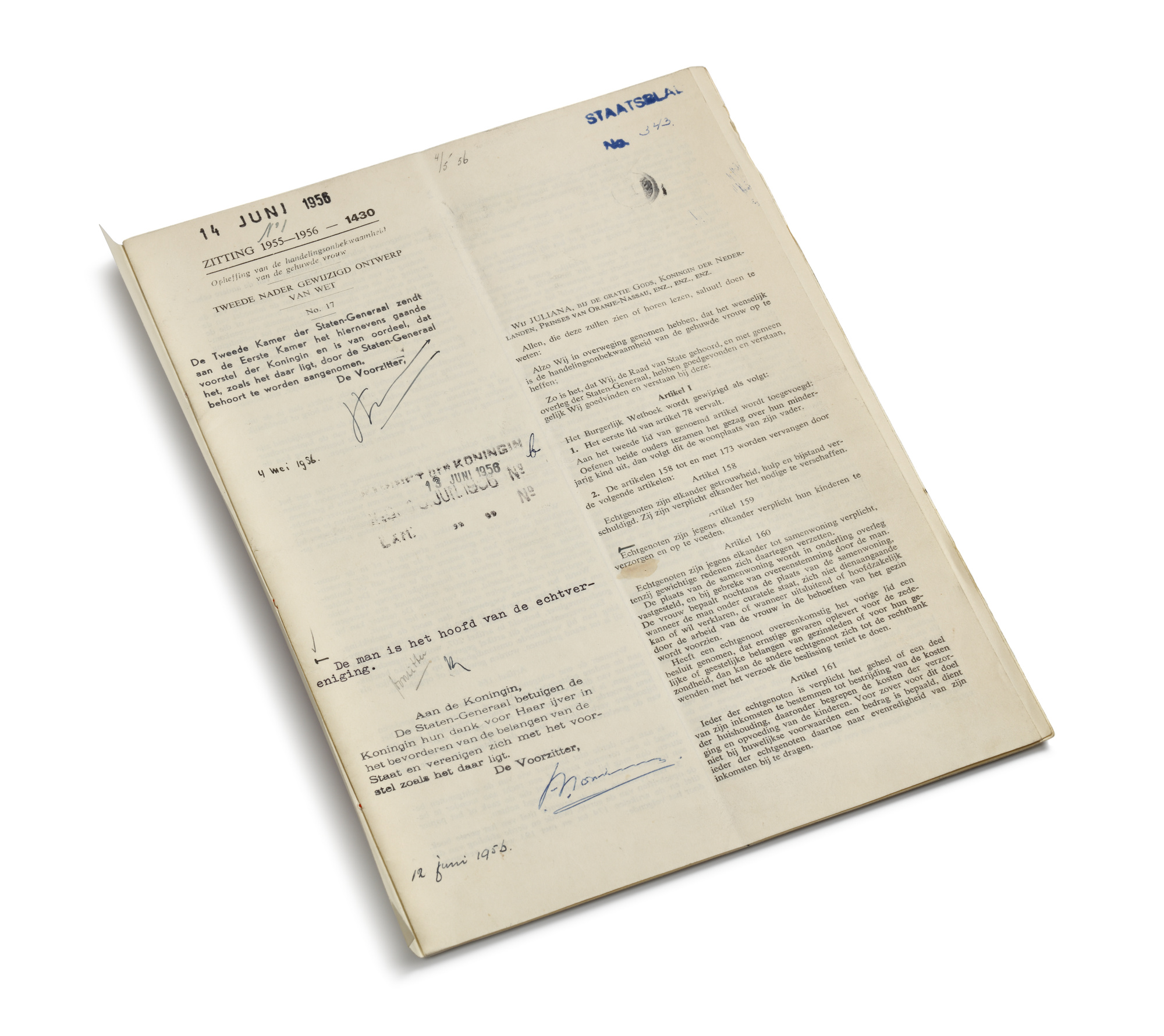
Lex van Oven (1956)

Tendeloo was instrumental in ending marital power (analogous to couverture under Common Law) in the Netherlands. As described in the 1838 civil code, under marital power, married women were legally "incompetent to act" (Dutch: handelingsonbekwaam), similar to the status of minors and people with severe mental health problems. (Note: Already in the country's first civil code, dating from 1809 and based on the Napoleonic Code, were the rights of married women limited.) This meant that in principle married women could not open a bank account, apply for a mortgage or insurance, or sign a labour agreement without the permission of their husband. In practice a "silent assent" (Dutch: stilzwijgende toestemming) was assumed for most contracts, but many educated women found their inferior legal position demeaning. Similar laws existed in other countries, often for centuries. (Note: In Europe, the roots of couverture dated from medieval Normandy, spreading to England during the Norman Conquest, and subsequently many parts of the rest of the world during the colonial expansion of the British Empire. Couverture codified in the Napoleonic Code spread with Napoleon's conquests into Europe and later to colonies in the rest of the world.) In January 1956, Minister of Justice Leendert Donker unexpectedly died; Tendeloo urged Prime Minister Willem Drees to appoint Julius Christiaan van Oven because of van Oven's views on equal legal rights for women and men and couverture in particular.

Van Oven put a basic principle of competency to act to a vote in February 1956, which passed by 56 to 11 votes. The Justice Select Committee amended the draft legislation by adding a sentence saying "the man is the head of the marriage" to placate Christian parties while having no legal effect. Tendeloo argued against the amendment, saying it was this very notion that was the root of the issues the new legislation was addressing. Nevertheless, the amendment passed with 41 votes in favour and 35 against. In May 1956, the House passed the new legislation, now called Lex van Oven, without taking a vote. Tendeloo celebrated, saying "The husband no longer is automatically right about everything and the wife's subordination is a thing of the past!" This debate in May 1956, during which Tendeloo said that it appeared the male members of the House were afraid, was her last in parliament. The next day she was admitted to hospital for a breast operation, which she had postponed to be able to be in parliament.

== Death and legacy ==
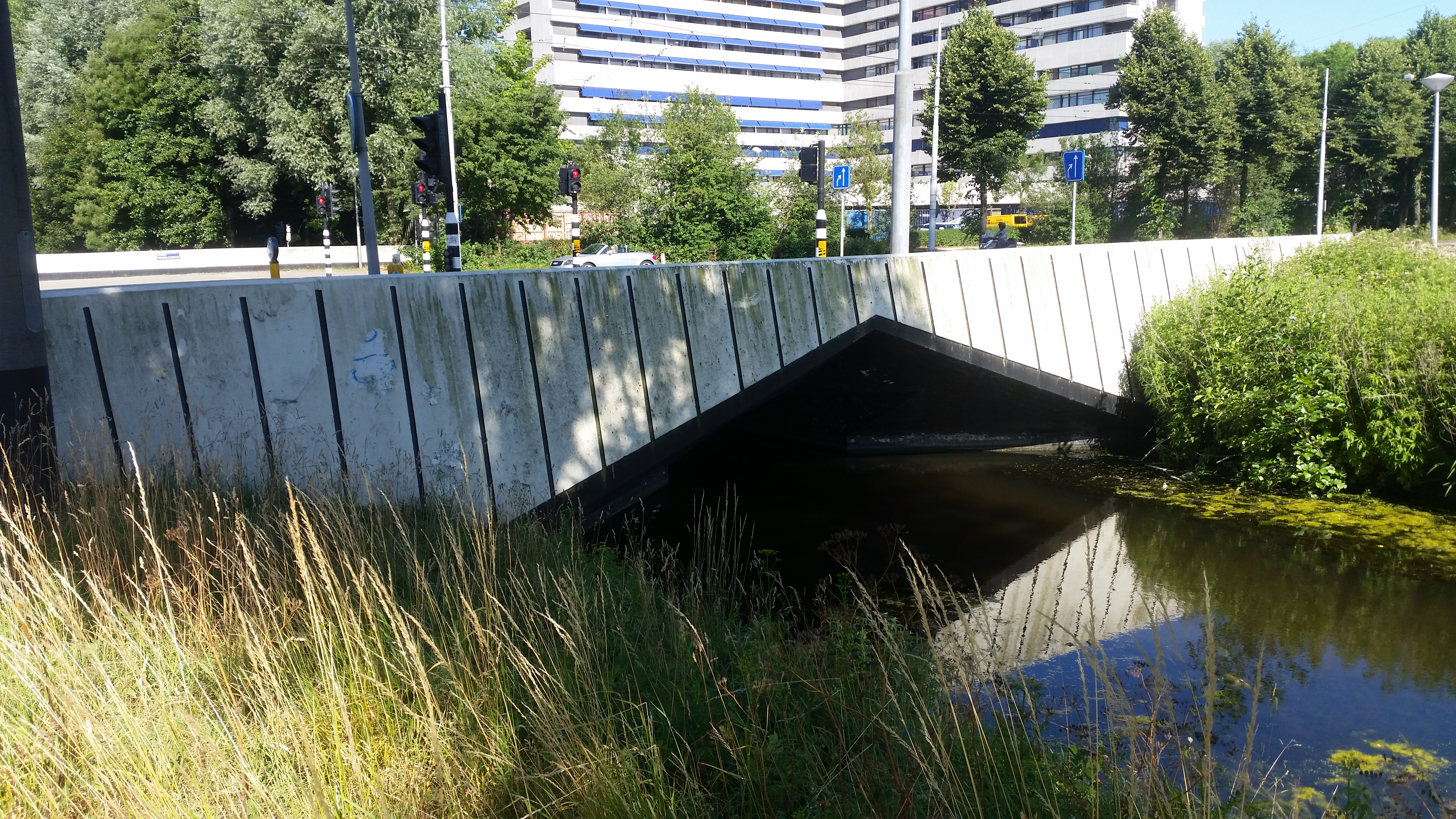
The Tendeloo Bridge in Amsterdam

Tendeloo died of cancer on 18 October 1956 in Wassenaar before any of her motions had been translated into law. Lex van Oven came into effect on 1 January 1957. (Note: Although the law no longer forced women to be dismissed from employment, for years afterwards women voluntarily resigned at marriage or when their first child was born.) During the next Drees cabinet, in November 1957, the ban on work for married women was abolished. The sentence "The man is the head of the marriage" survived in the law until 1970. In 1975, equal pay became law. Tendeloo frequently used a French saying to describe her own fighting approach: "Frappez, frappez toujours!", which translates as "Knock and keep knocking!" Merel Ek of the Museum of Democracy said this tireless spirit was exemplified by Tendeloo postponing her operation to be able to debate in parliament. According to Posthumus-van der Goot, Tendeloo deployed the techniques the male members of the House used: they commonly first stated they had listened with great interest to the speaker and agreed with what was said, with just one addition, and then followed it with a sharp critique. Tendeloo said she could only be taken seriously in parliament if she used this technique.

Tendeloo was buried in Bilthoven on 22 October; her funeral was attended by nearly all members of the House of Representatives. Liesbeth Ribbius Peletier, former chair of the VVGS and fellow PvdA member, praised Tendeloo's efforts and called her an "energetic and relentless women's rights fighter". Jaap Burger, the PvdA House leader, said she had earned much respect in parliament. Beethoven's Ode to Joy was played. Afterwards, Speaker of the House of Representatives Rad Kortenhorst said in parliament that she had been "an apostle" with "sharp, legal insights"; Prime Minister Drees praised her great dedication to women's rights issues. PvdA colleague Rita de Bruin called her a "tireless fighter for women's rights". Algemeen Dagblad called her "one of the most capable and successful feminists" and "honest and broad of opinion, always opposed to untruth". Het Parool commented that it must have given her great satisfaction just before she died to see the appointment of Marga Klompé as the first female minister of the Netherlands, something she had urged Drees to do already in 1952.

In the remainder of the 20th century, despite the second wave of feminism in the 1960s and 1970s, Tendeloo was largely forgotten. More recently, Tendeloo came to be seen as one of the few who kept feminism alive in the Netherlands between the first and second waves of feminism. Lilianne Ploumen, member of the House of Representatives for the PvdA, said in 2019 that Tendeloo has done more for women than any prime minister in Tendeloo's time, adding that it was time to put Tendeloo in the history textbooks. In the same year, in a retrospective of women's rights movements, the Dutch government called her a "fierce protestor" against the gender inequalities in the civil code. A bridge in Amsterdam was named after her in 2016 and streets bearing her name can be found in the cities of Arnhem and Deventer. An online petition to get a statue erected in The Hague to honour Tendeloo was signed over 18,000 times but paused when the COVID-19 pandemic started.

== Bibliography ==
- Tendeloo, N. S. C.; Hoek-Van Nieuwkerk, A. J.; Weyers, A. H. (1936). "De oude-dags-voorziening voor werkende vrouwen" [Providing for Working Women who Retired]. Rapport aan het bestuur van de Nederlandsche Bond van Vrouwen werkzaam in Bedrijf en Beroep afd. Amsterdam (in Dutch). Amsterdam.
- Tendeloo, N. S. C.; Boer, J. (1940). De techniek van het vereenigingsleven [The Technique of Association Life] (in Dutch). Rotterdam: Nijgh & van Ditmar.
- Tendeloo, N. S. C. (1946). "De Vrijzinnig-Democratische vrouwen" [The Free Democratic women]. In Pothuis-Smit, C. (ed.). Wat deden vrouwen met haar kiesrecht? [What did Women do with their Right to Vote?] (in Dutch). Arnhem: Van Loghum Slaterus. pp. 161–71.
- N. S. C. Tendeloo (1946—1956): Parlementaria column in Vrouwenbelangen (monthly magazine VVGS; in Dutch).
- Tendeloo, N. S. C. (1949). "Generale preventie" [General prevention]. Socialisme en Democratie (in Dutch). 6 (12): 749–51.
