= Mozes Meijer Cohen =

Dutch politician (1877–1943)

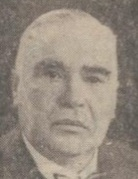
- Mozes Meijer Cohen in 1937

Member of the House of Representatives
- In office 15 September 1936 – 13 March 1940

Personal details
- Born: 14 September 1877 Assen, Netherlands
- Died: 7 May 1943 (aged 65) Sobibor extermination camp, General Government
- Party: VDB
- Spouse: Adèle Hartog (m. 1909)
- Children: 1

Mozes Meijer Cohen (14 September 1877 – 7 May 1943) was a Dutch politician. He was a member of the Dutch House of Representatives for the Free-thinking Democratic League (VDB) from 1936 to 1940, and served in the Amsterdam municipal council from 1934 to 1935 and from 1936 to 1938.

== Biography ==
Mozes Meijer Cohen was born in Assen on 14 September 1877 to Hartog Cohen, a railway employee, and Betje van Zuiden. His grandfather M.M. Cohen Jr. was a well-known religious teacher and writer in Assen. After completing his secondary school education, Cohen became a tax official at the Dutch Tax and Customs Administration, first in Watergraafsmeer and from 1913 in Amsterdam. On 31 March 1909, Cohen married Adèle Hartog in Meerssen, with whom he would have one daughter.

Cohen was active in the independent trade union movement, serving as a member of the executive of the trade union for tax officials in 1925 and the chairman of that union from 1934. In 1936, he became chairman of the Central Committee of Neutral Government Personnel, an umbrella organisation of white-collar trade unions. From 1929, he served as a member of the High Council of Labour, an economic advisory council which was the predecessor of the Social and Economic Council. Cohen was an active member of the Jewish community of Amsterdam.

After he had moved to Amsterdam, Cohen became involved with the local Free-thinking Democratic League (VDB). In 1934, he was elected to the municipal council of Amsterdam for the VDB, left the year after, and returned to the municipal council in 1936. On 15 September 1936, Mozes Meijer Cohen joined the House of Representatives, replacing Theo Ketelaar. As an MP, he mainly spoke about issues involving government workers, pensions, taxation, and telecommunications. In 1938 Cohen left the municipal council of Amsterdam due to his inability to combine that role with his position as MP, and was replaced by Corry Tendeloo. During this period, Cohen was frequently ill, and became increasingly absent from the House of Representatives. In December 1939, fellow VDB MP Klaas Bijlsma proposed appointing a temporary replacement for Cohen, on the understanding that Cohen would regain his position once he had recovered. Cohen resigned as MP on 13 March 1940, and was replaced by Herman Arnold Zwijnenberg.

On 7 May 1943, Cohen was murdered at Sobibor extermination camp along with his wife.

== Bibliography ==
- Klijnsma, Meine Henk (2007). Om de Democratie: de Geschiedenis van de Vrijzinnig-Democratische Bond, 1901-1946 [About Democracy: the History of the Free-thinking Democratic League, 1901-1946] (in Dutch). Amsterdam: Bert Bakker. ISBN 978-90-351-3239-9.
