= Theo Ketelaar =

Dutch politician (1864–1936)

- Theo Ketelaar in 1913

Member of the House of Representatives
- In office 21 September 1897 – 27 June 1936
- Constituency: Amsterdam V (until 1918)

Member of the Provincial Council of North Holland
- In office 26 October 1905 – 27 June 1936

Personal details
- Born: Theodore Matthieu Ketelaar; 6 May 1864 Amsterdam, Netherlands
- Died: 27 June 1936 (aged 72) Amsterdam, Netherlands
- Party: Radical League (until 1901); VDB (1901–1936)
- Spouse(s): Gesina Legel (m. 1894; died 1907) Wilhelmina Johanna Helena Maria van Goch (m. 1915)
- Children: 1

Theodore Matthieu "Theo" Ketelaar (6 May 1864 – 27 June 1936) was a Dutch schoolteacher, trade unionist, and politician. He was a member of the Dutch House of Representatives from 1897 until 1901 for the Radical League and from 1901 until 1936 for the Free-thinking Democratic League (VDB). He also served in the Provincial Council of North Holland from 1905 to 1936, the provincial executive of North Holland from 1912 to 1923 and as alderman of Amsterdam from 1927 to 1929.

== Early life ==
Theo Ketelaar was born on 6 May 1864 in Amsterdam to Johann Gottlieb Ketelaar, a grain porter from the Kingdom of Prussia, and Gesina Christina Looman. Ketelaar decided to follow his older brother to become a teacher, and in 1882 he obtained his teaching certificate after which he began work as a teacher in Amsterdam. He was active in the anti-war organization Pax Humanitate in the 1880s, and joined the local teachers' union in Amsterdam, headed by his brother. In 1889, Ketelaar became general secretary of the Union of Dutch Teachers (Bond van Nederlandsche Onderwijzers, BNO), also serving as the head editor of the Union's newspaper De Bode. He worked to establish BNO locals throughout the Netherlands. Ketelaar sought to resist the growing influence of social democrats aligned with the Social Democratic Workers' Party (SDAP) within the BNO, and fought for the interests of secular public education. He would remain the BNO's general secretary until 1907, when he became a school inspector in Hilversum.

== Political career ==
Ketelaar was a radical, serving as head of the local radical electoral association in Amsterdam De Radicale Vereeniging from 1897 and secretary of the Radical League in 1898. Ketelaar was first elected to the Dutch House of Representatives in the 1897 Dutch general election representing the Amsterdam V electoral district, defeating fellow BNO executive member and SDAP member Johannes Gerardus van Kuijkhof and Nicolaas Pierson. Ketelaar and fellow Amsterdam radical MP Piet Nolting initially sat as independents, remaining outside the progressive liberal parliamentary group led by Hendrik Goeman Borgesius. In 1901, he joined the Free-thinking Democratic League (VDB), becoming a member of the party executive soon after. As an MP, Ketelaar was the VDB's education spokesperson, and also concerned himself with various other issues including finance, internal affairs, colonial affairs, and defense. He was known as an uncharismatic speaker, who sometimes supplemented his parliamentary speeches with quotes in foreign languages such as French. Ketelaar was a part of the left wing of the House of Representatives, due to his relatively progressive stances on matters including franchise expansion, labour law, pensions, and his support for cooperation with the Social Democratic Workers' Party (SDAP).

In 1905, Ketelaar was first elected to the Provincial Council of North Holland, and in 1907 Ketelaar joined the municipal council of Amsterdam with the support of the BNO. That year, Ketelaar was one of four VDB MPs to vote against the defence budget, leading to the fall of the De Meester cabinet. In 1911, Ketelaar along with three other VDB MPs, voted against a law from minister Robert Regout to combat vice and gambling. He left the Amsterdam municipal council in 1912 to join the provincial executive of North Holland, in which he served until 1923.

As the VDB's main expert on education, Ketelaar argued for more primary schooling and an end to child labour. His influence in teacher circles and the BNO contributed to the VDB remaining popular among teachers. He participated in the committee led by Dirk Bos to bring an end to the school struggle (schoolstrijd), and despite his support for public education defended the compromise brokered by the Cort van der Linden cabinet equally funding public and religious education for what he saw as its positive impact on public education and the concurrent establishment of universal male suffrage. He also advocated for better education for the children of sailors, the blind, and adult education, more school doctors, and improved career education.

In 1921, Ketelaar submitted a motion to increase benefits for government workers, which failed in the House by a single vote. During a 1922 conflict within the VDB over the party's electoral list, Ketelaar remained loyal to the party leadership. In 1923, Ketelaar returned to the Amsterdam municipal council, where he became the leader of the VDB group. In 1927, Ketelaar became alderman responsible for education and the arts, as part of an attempt by Carl Romme to decrease the influence of the SDAP. His performance as alderman earned him the ire of mayor Willem de Vlugt, and Ketelaar was forced to resign in 1929 following a motion of no-confidence by the Amsterdam municipal council. In the late 1920s and 1930s, Ketelaar increasingly lost influence within the VDB. A secular agnostic in a party increasingly dominated by liberal Protestantism and a staunch pacifist who voted against the defense budget every year throughout his career as MP, he increasingly became seen as an anachronism within his party, though his personal popularity ensured his continued nomination for election. He was critical of the Second Colijn cabinet and VDB minister of education Henri Marchant's funding cuts to public education though he went along with them, and the refusal of the Christian parties to agree to the consolidation of religious schools.

Theo Ketelaar died on 27 June 1936 in Amsterdam. Ketelaar continuously served in the House of Representatives for 39 years, making him the third longest serving Dutch MP of all time. He was succeeded as MP by Mozes Meijer Cohen.

== Personal life ==
Ketelaar was married twice, first marrying Gesina Legel on 26 July 1894, with whom he had one daughter. After her death in 1907 he remarried to Wilhelmina Johanna Helena Maria van Goch on 30 March 1915.

Ketelaar was raised in the Dutch Reformed Church, but became an agnostic later in life. On 31 August 1905, Ketelaar became a knight in the Order of the Netherlands Lion.

== Bibliography ==
- Klijnsma, Meine Henk (2007). Om de Democratie: de Geschiedenis van de Vrijzinnig-Democratische Bond, 1901-1946 [About Democracy: the History of the Free-thinking Democratic League, 1901-1946] (in Dutch). Amsterdam: Bert Bakker. ISBN 978-90-351-3239-9.
