= Usquert =

- Village
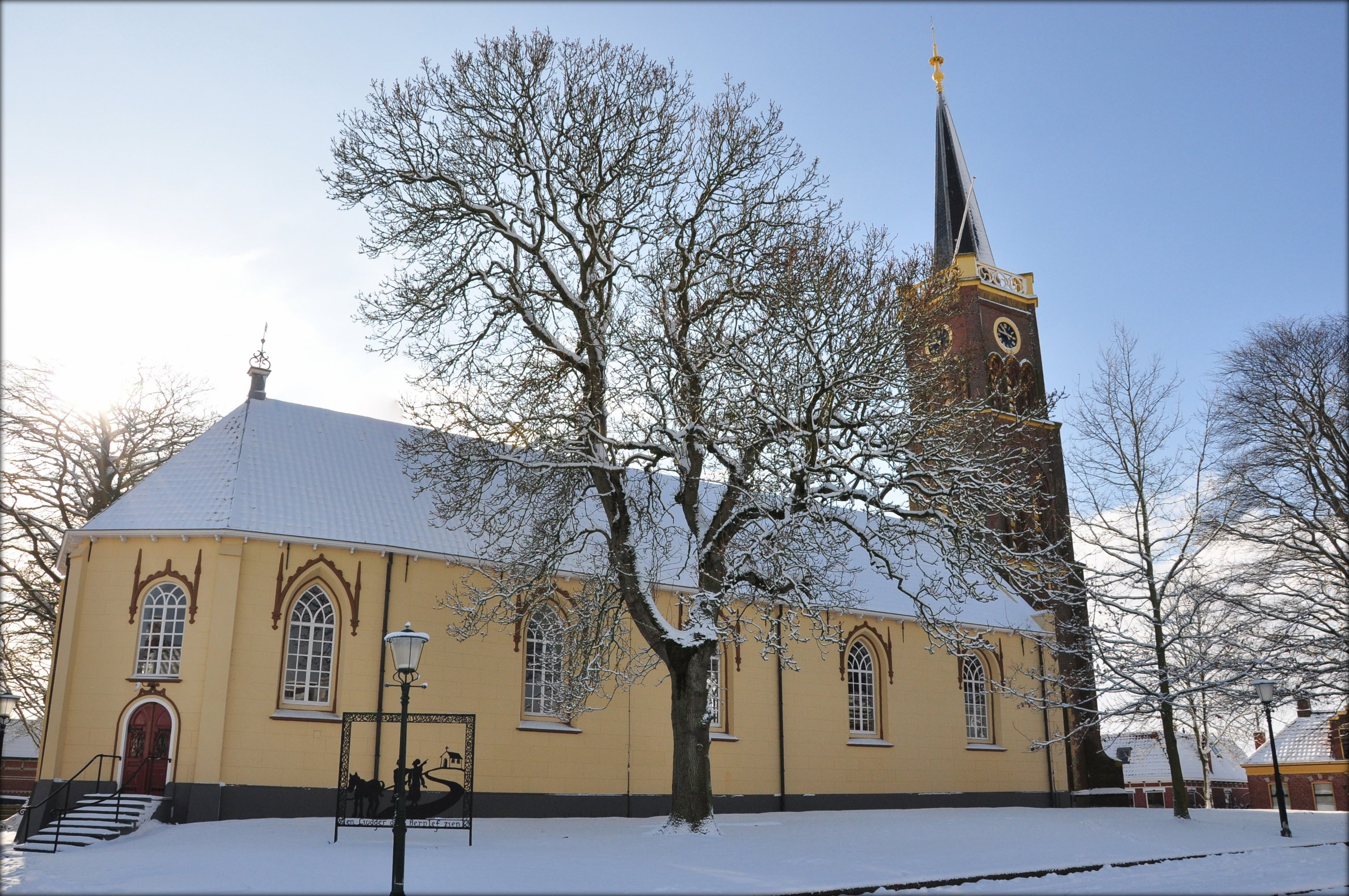
- Usquert Church

- Coat of arms

- Location of Usquert in the province of Groningen
- Coordinates: 53°24′10″N 6°36′46″E
- Country: Netherlands
- Province: Groningen
- Municipality: Het Hogeland

Area
  - Total: 1.37 km^{2} (0.53 sq mi)
- Elevation: 0.7 m (2.3 ft)

Population (2021)
  - Total: 1,180
  - Density: 861/km^{2} (2,230/sq mi)
- Time zone: UTC+1 (CET)
  - Summer (DST): UTC+2 (CEST)
- Postal code: 9988
- Dialing code: 0595

Usquert (Gronings: Oskerd [ˈɔskət]) is a village in the Dutch province of Groningen. It is located in the municipality of Het Hogeland. It had a population of around 1,415 in January 2017.

== History ==
Usquert was a separate municipality until 1990, when it became part of Hefshuizen. After that, the name of the municipality was changed to Eemsmond in 1992.

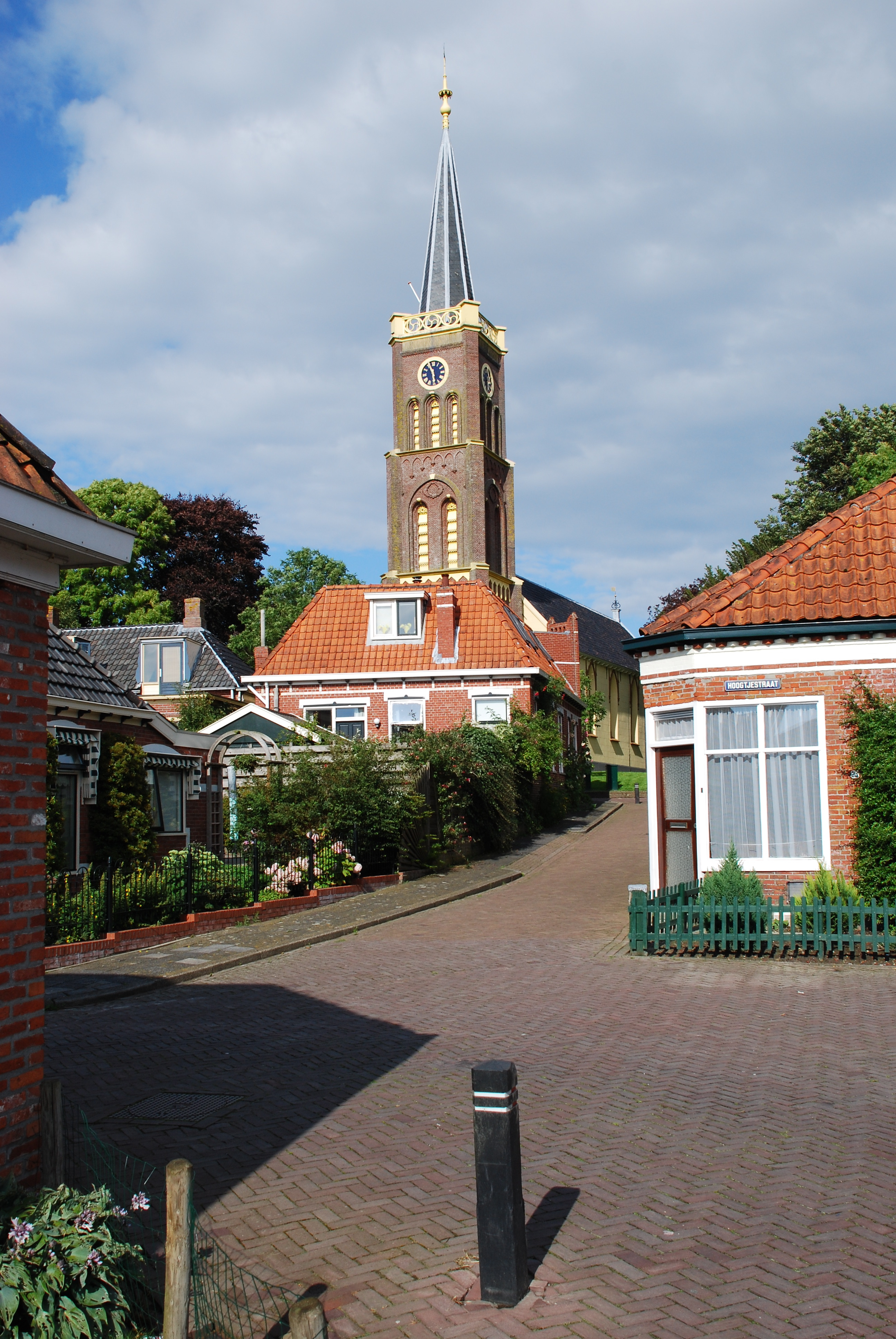
The church on the wierde

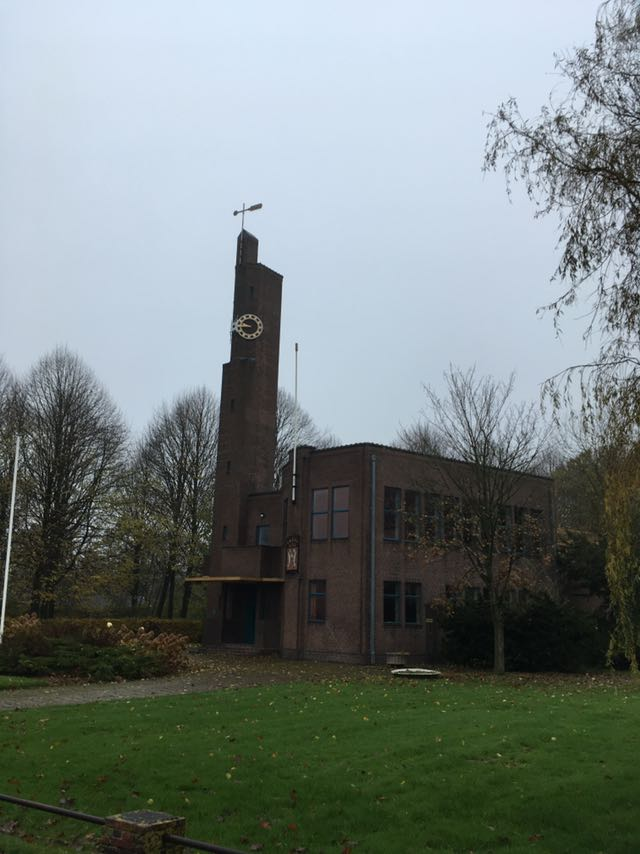
Former Usquert town hall

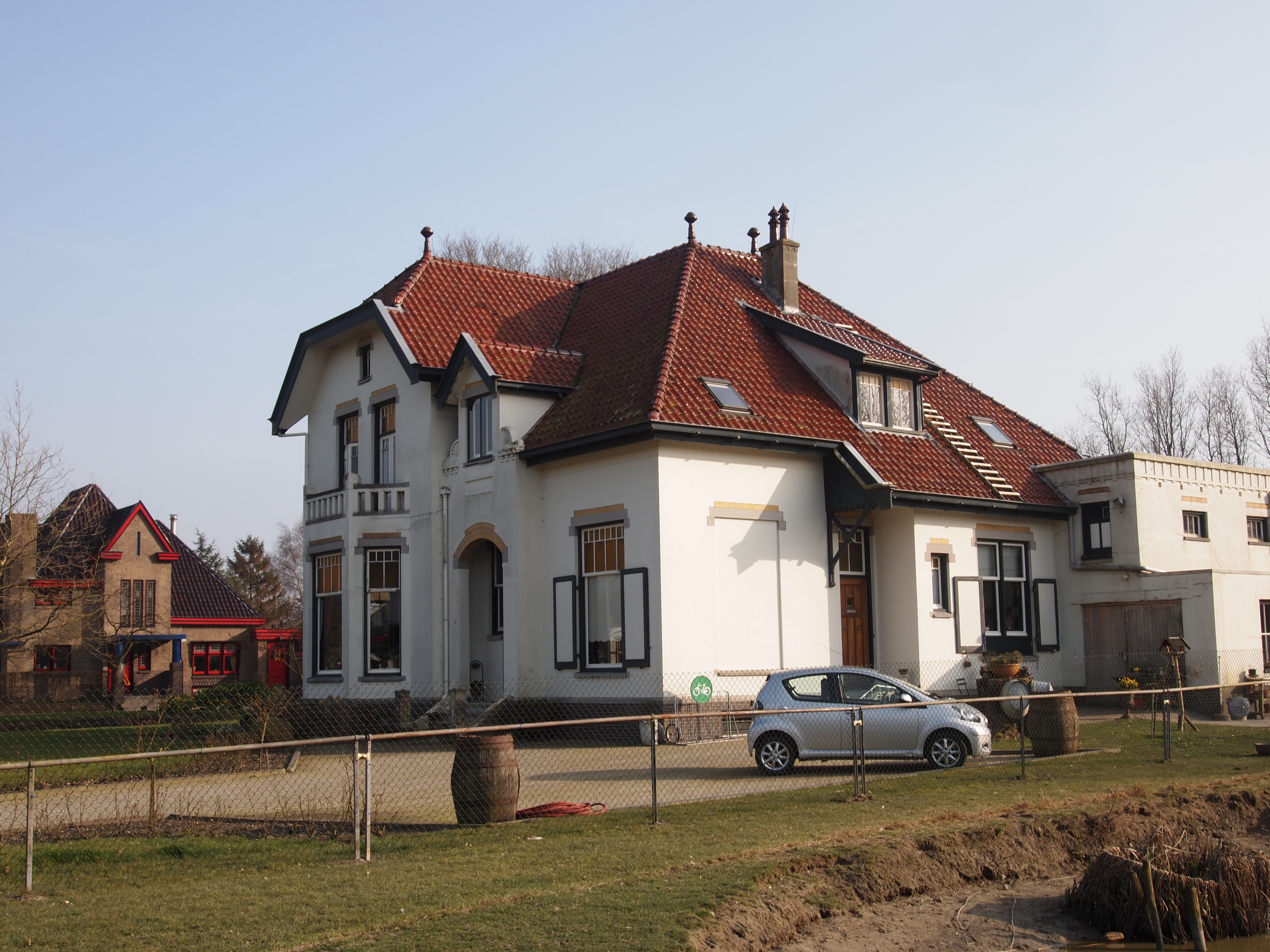
Villa in Usquert

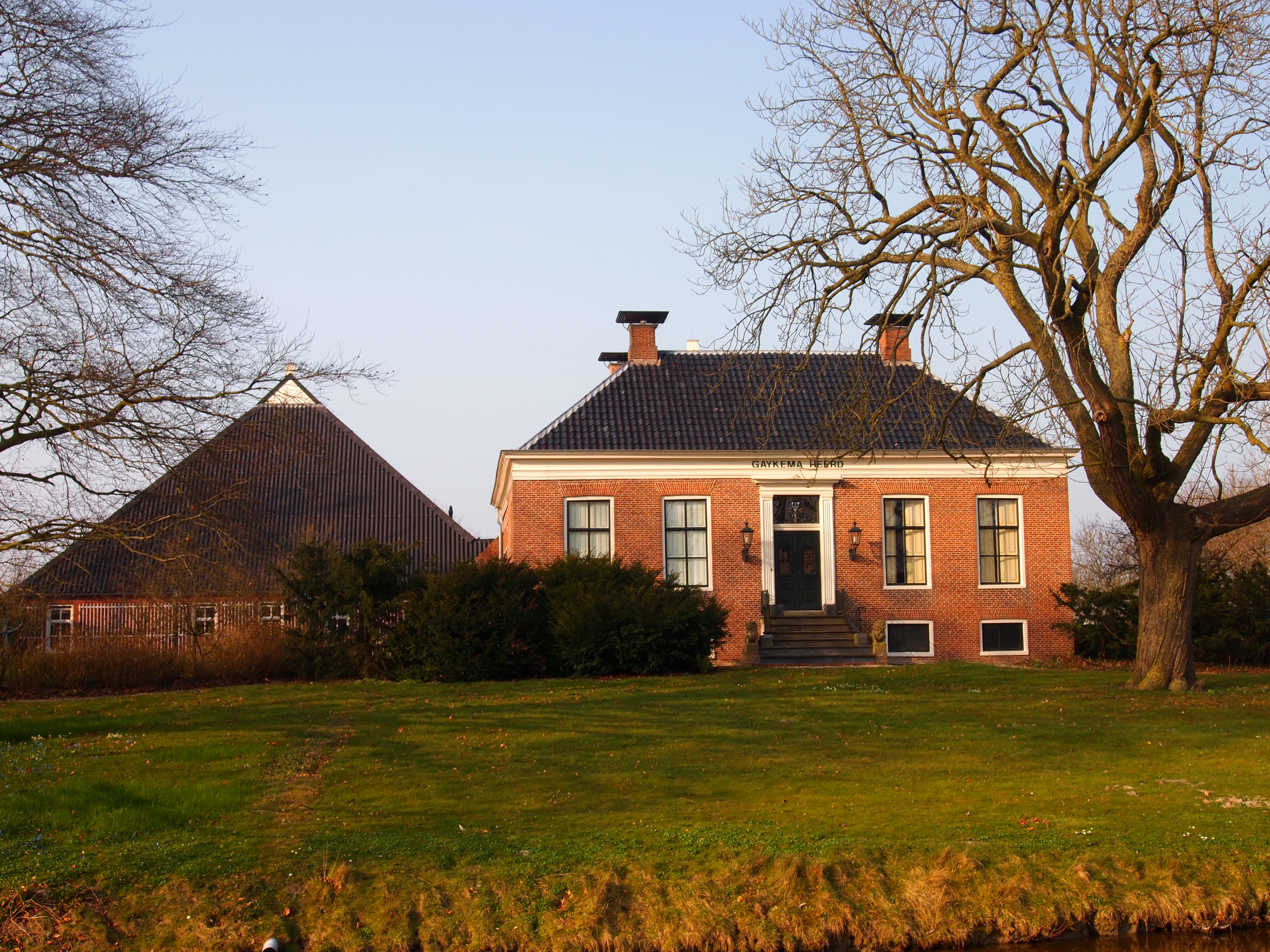
Farm in Usquert
