= Jeanne Fortanier-de Wit =

20th-century Dutch politician who fought for equal rights for women

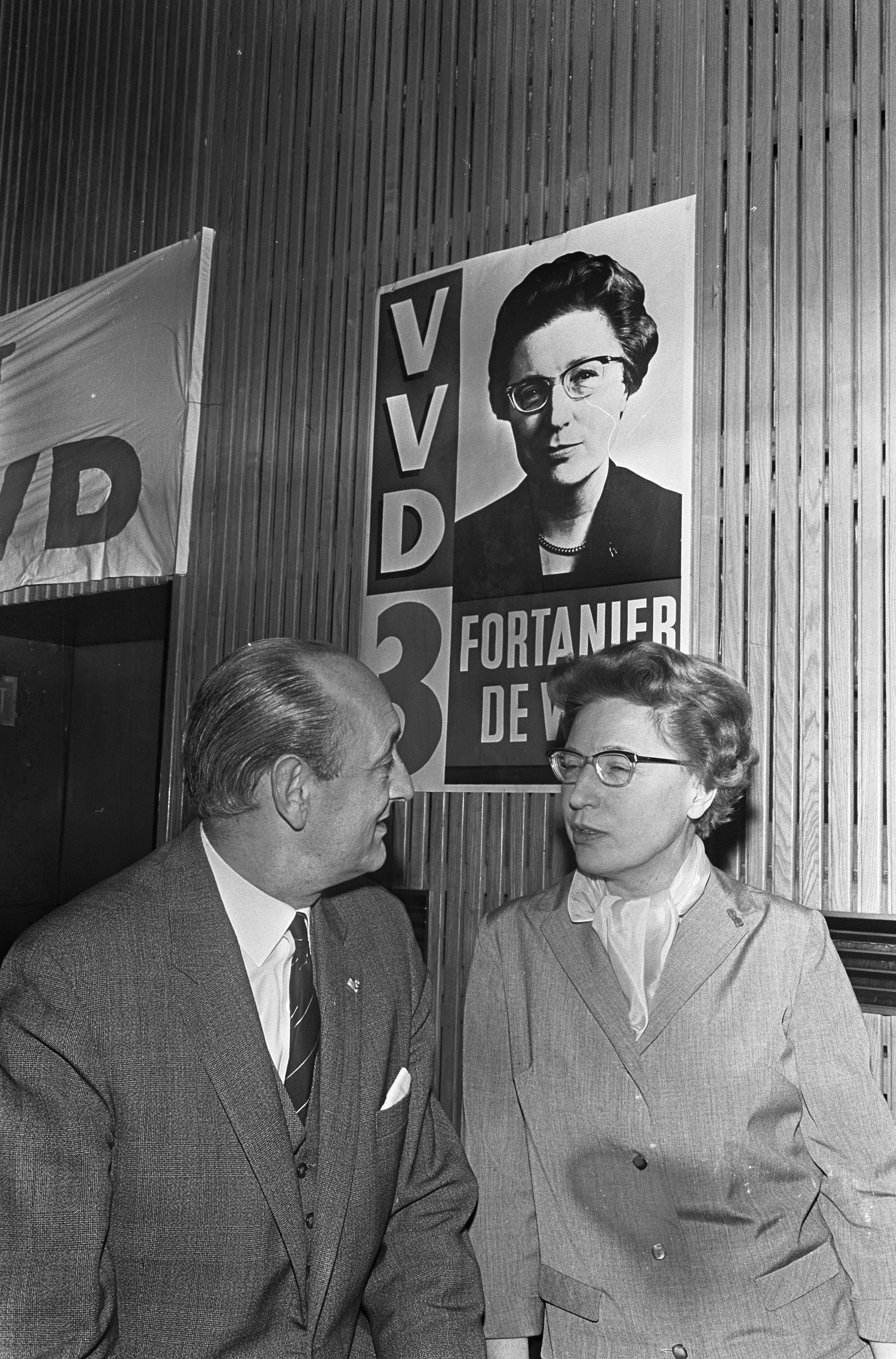
- Jeanne Fortanier-de Wit with minister Edzo Toxopeus

Member of the House of Representatives
- In office 1946–1958
- Parliamentary group: PvdV, VVD

Personal details
- Born: Adriana Fortanier-de Wit; 19 April 1907 the Hague, the Netherlands
- Died: 23 December 1993 (aged 86) Velsen-Zuid, the Netherlands

Adriana (Jeanne) Fortanier-de Wit (19 April 1907 - 23 December 1993) was a Dutch politician who was member of the House of Representatives for the Freedom Party (Dutch: Partij van de Vrijheid, PvdV) from 1946 until 1948, and then for the People's Party for Freedom and Democracy (Dutch: Volkspartij voor Vrijheid en Democratie, VVD) until 1958.
