= Frans-Jozef van Thiel =

Dutch politician (1906–1993)

His Excellency Frans-Jozef van Thiel
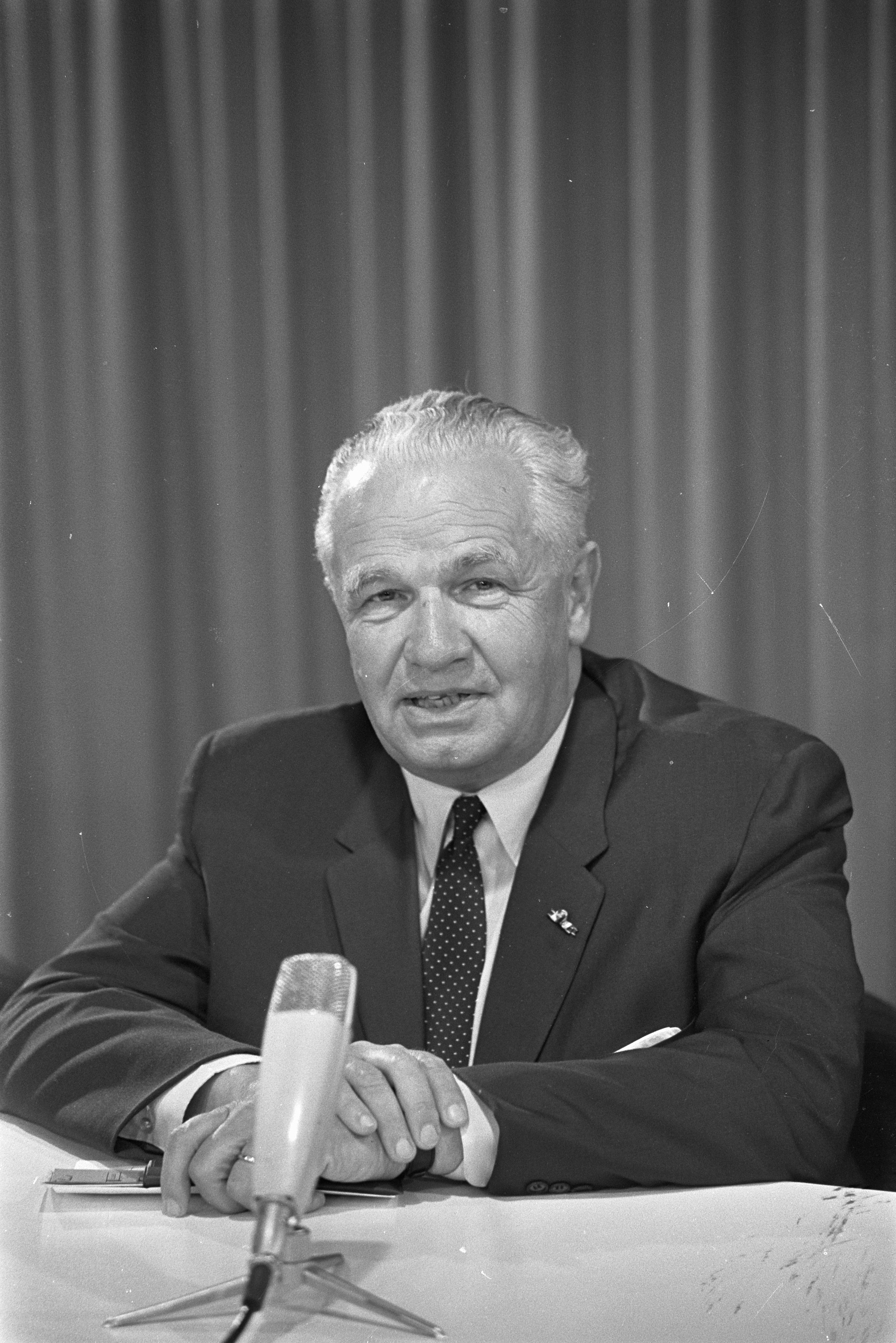
- Van Thiel in 1968

Speaker of the House of Representatives
- In office 29 January 1963 – 7 December 1972
- Preceded by: Rad Kortenhorst
- Succeeded by: Anne Vondeling

Minister of Social Work
- In office 9 September 1952 – 13 October 1956
- Prime Minister: Willem Drees
- Preceded by: Louis Beel (Ad interim)
- Succeeded by: Marga Klompé

Member of the House of Representatives
- In office 6 November 1956 – 7 December 1972
- In office 3 July 1956 – 3 October 1956
- In office 27 July 1948 – 15 July 1952
- Parliamentary group: Catholic People's Party

Personal details
- Born: Frans Joseph Frits Maria van Thiel; 19 December 1906 Helmond, Netherlands
- Died: 2 June 1993 (aged 86) Helmond, Netherlands
- Party: Christian Democratic Appeal (from 1980)
- Other political affiliations: Catholic People's Party (1945–1980); Roman Catholic; State Party (until 1945)
- Spouse: Carolina Hoijng (m. 1931)
- Children: 4 sons and 2 daughters
- Education: Radboud University Nijmegen (Bachelor of Laws, Master of Laws)
- Occupation: Politician · Jurist · Lawyer · Prosecutor · Corporate director · Nonprofit director

Frans Joseph Frits Maria "Frans-Jozef" van Thiel (19 December 1906 – 2 June 1993) was a Dutch politician of the defunct Catholic People's Party (KVP) now merged into the Christian Democratic Appeal (CDA) and lawyer.

He was a member of the House of Representatives from 1948 until 1972, with exception of the fours years from 1952–1956 in which he served as minister of Social Work. He was Speaker of the House of Representatives in the period 29 January 1963 – 7 December 1972.

== Decorations ==
Honours
Ribbon bar	Honour	Country	Date	Comment
	Grand Officer of the Order of Orange-Nassau	Netherlands	1964	Elevated from Commander (21 November 1956)
	Commander of the Order of the Netherlands Lion	Netherlands	7 December 1972	

Political offices
Preceded by Louis Beel; Ad interim	Minister of Social Work; 1952–1956	Succeeded by Marga Klompé
Preceded by Rad Kortenhorst	Speaker of the House of Representatives; 1963–1972	Succeeded by Anne Vondeling
