= Fekko Ebel Hajo Ebels =

Dutch politician (1878–1951)

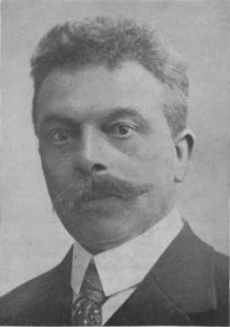
- Fekko Ebel Hajo Ebels in 1938

Member of the House of Representatives
- In office 22 July 1922 – 4 June 1946

Member of the Provincial Council of Groningen
- In office 4 July 1916 – 2 July 1935

Personal details
- Born: 18 August 1878 Kroonpolder, Netherlands
- Died: 18 January 1951 (aged 72) Winschoten, Netherlands
- Party: VDB (1908–1946); PvdA (from 1946)
- Spouse: Eppien Jantina Nannenga (m. 1901)
- Children: 2

Fekko Ebel Hajo Ebels (18 August 1878 – 18 January 1951) was a Dutch politician. He was a member of the Dutch House of Representatives from 1922 to 1946 and of the Provincial Council of Groningen from 1916 to 1935, initially for the Free-thinking Democratic League (VDB) and from 1946 for the Labour Party (PvdA).

== Early life ==
Fekko Ebel Hajo Ebels was born on 18 August 1878 in the township of Kroonpolder, in the municipality of Beerta, to Hajo Ebels and Esse Ebbens. His family belonged to a class of wealthy "gentleman farmers" in the province of Groningen, who owned large farms with many labourers and were generally liberal or progressive in politics. After completing his secondary education in Winschoten in 1897, Ebels became a farmer himself. He was involved in many farming organisations, heading the Groningen Agricultural Society in Beerta and serving as chairman of the co-operative dairy factory "De Dollaard" in Nieuweschans.

== Political career ==
Ebels became active in the Free-thinking Democratic League (VDB), and served in the municipal council of Beerta from 1913 to 1916. In 1916, he was elected to the Provincial Council of Groningen, which he was a member of until 1935. Ebels was first elected to the House of Representatives following the 1922 Dutch general election. As an MP, Ebels was mainly known as an expert on agriculture, and also spoke about water infrastructure on occasion. He was considered a representative of the interests of the VDB's agrarian base, as well as of the northern Netherlands and Groningen in particular.

In 1932, Ebels proposed a law allowing small tenant farmers, who formed a significant part of the VDB's electoral base, to request a rent reduction from their landlords following the failure of a government proposal to reform land rent law. If both sides were unable to come to an agreement, a special crisis rent court would be established which could mandate rent reductions. The proposal was politically popular, and eventually was passed into law.

He returned to the House of Representatives after World War II, but distraught over the death of his son Everhard in 1945, Ebels chose not to run in the 1946 Dutch general election.

== Personal life ==
On 26 April 1901, Ebels married Eppien Jantien Nannenga, with whom he would have two sons. In 1945, during the liberation of the Netherlands, Ebels's son Everhard, a committed National Socialist, was murdered by Polish troops along with his family and three other children. He had previously given information to German artillery on the other side of the front by telephone from his farm.

His brother Edzo Hommes Ebels was a member of the Vrijheidsbond, later the Freedom Party (PvdV) and then the People's Party for Freedom and Democracy (VVD), serving as Queen's Commissioner for Groningen from 1945 to 1955.

== Bibliography ==
- Klijnsma, Meine Henk (2007). Om de Democratie: de Geschiedenis van de Vrijzinnig-Democratische Bond, 1901-1946 [About Democracy: the History of the Free-thinking Democratic League, 1901-1946] (in Dutch). Amsterdam: Bert Bakker. ISBN 978-90-351-3239-9.
