= Jacob Algera =

Dutch politician

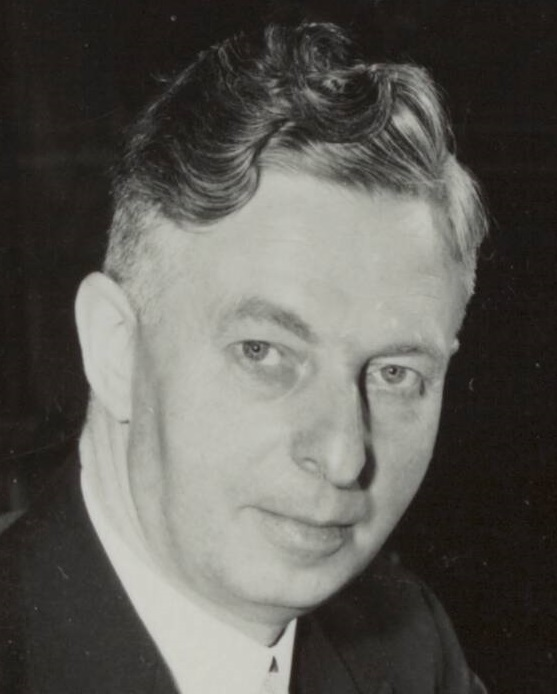
- Algera in 1952

Member of the Council of State
- In office 1 November 1958 – 8 December 1966
- Vice President: Bram Rutgers (1958–1959); Louis Beel (1959–1966)

Minister of Transport and Water Management
- In office 2 September 1952 – 10 October 1958
- Prime Minister: Willem Drees
- Preceded by: Hendrik Wemmers
- Succeeded by: Herman Witte (Ad interim)

Mayor of Leeuwarden
- In office 5 May 1945 – 16 March 1946; Ad interim
- Preceded by: Wilhelm Schönhard
- Succeeded by: Adriaan van der Meulen

Member of the House of Representatives
- In office 3 July 1956 – 3 October 1956
- In office 21 September 1937 – 2 September 1952
- Parliamentary group: Anti-Revolutionary Party

Personal details
- Born: Jacob Algera; 20 March 1902 Wirdum, Netherlands
- Died: 8 December 1966 (aged 64) The Hague, Netherlands
- Party: Anti-Revolutionary Party
- Spouse: Froukje Lieuwes Wijnia (m. 1928)
- Children: Tjitske Algera (1935–2006)
- Education: University of Groningen (Bachelor of Laws, Master of Laws)
- Occupation: Politician · civil servant · Jurist · Academic administrator

Jacob Algera (20 March 1902 – 8 December 1966) was a Dutch politician of the defunct Anti-Revolutionary Party (ARP) now merged into the Christian Democratic Appeal (CDA).

== Decorations ==
Honours
Ribbon bar	Honour	Country	Date	Comment
	Grand Officer of the Order of Orange-Nassau	Netherlands	22 December 1958	

Political offices
Preceded by Wilhelm Schönhard	Mayor of Leeuwarden; Ad interim 1945–1946	Succeeded by Adriaan van der Meulen
Preceded by Hendrik Wemmers	Minister of Transport and Water Management; 1952–1958	Succeeded by Herman Witte; Ad interim
Academic offices
Unknown	President of the Vrije Universiteit Amsterdam; 1960–1965	Unknown
Unknown	President of the University of Groningen; 1965–1966	Unknown
