= Cor Borst =

Dutch politician (1891-1974)

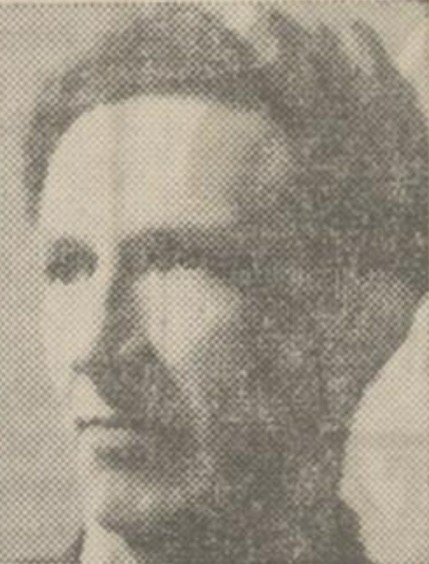
- Cor Borst in 1946

Member of the House of Representatives
- In office 11 April 1946 – 15 July 1952
- In office 13 December 1956 – 1 April 1962

Member of the Provincial Council of North Holland
- In office 25 April 1939 – 1 September 1941

Personal details
- Born: Cornelis Borst; 1 February 1891 Noord-Scharwoude, Netherlands
- Died: 11 May 1974 (aged 83) Weesp, Netherlands
- Party: CPN (1935-1974)
- Spouse(s): Rensje Blom (m. 1915; div. 1971) Daatje Heitman (m. 1971)

Cornelis "Cor" Borst (1 February 1891 – 11 May 1974) was a Dutch politician. He served as a member of the Dutch House of Representatives for the Communist Party of the Netherlands (CPN) from 1946 to 1952 and from 1956 to 1962.

== Biography ==
Cor Borst was born on 1 February 1891 in Noord-Scharwoude to Pieter Borst, a horticulturalist, and Aaltje Swager. During World War I, Cor Borst began his own horticultural enterprise, which he would keep until 1946. After undertaking a study trip to the Soviet Union in 1934, Borst joined the Communist Party of the Netherlands (CPN) in 1935. That same year, he was elected as a member of the municipal council of Oudkarspel for the CPN, a role in which he served until 1941. In 1939, Borst was elected to the North Holland provincial council, where he served until 1941. During World War II, Borst participated in the Dutch resistance, operating an illegal newspaper, and from 1941 he went into hiding in Amsterdam.

Following the 1946 Dutch general election, Borst was elected to the House of Representatives as a representative of the CPN. As an MP, Borst primarily focused on agriculture, fisheries, small business affairs and housing. He was an advocate for land nationalisation. He opposed the European Economic Community's agricultural policy, as well as agricultural fees for the Landbouwschap.

After the CPN's electoral loss in the 1952 Dutch general election, Borst left the House of Representatives, but he returned as MP in 1956. During the 1958 conflict within the CPN over the political group led by Henk Gortzak and Gerben Wagenaar, Borst remained loyal to the CPN and its leader Paul de Groot. In 1962, Borst left the House of Representatives. In addition to his role as MP, Borst was a member of the CPN's leadership from 1946 to 1955 and from 1959 onwards, headed the CPN's Agrarian Office from 1953 to 1955, and was the editor of the horticultural publication "Echo van het Land".

Cor Borst died on 11 May 1974 in Weesp.

== Personal life ==
Cor Borst was married twice, first to Rensje Blom, whom he married on 24 May 1915 and divorced on 1 January 1971, and second to Daatje Heitman, whom he married on 30 June 1971. He had no children.
