= Freedom Party (Netherlands) =

Freedom Party Partij van de Vrijheid
- Leader: Steven Bierema
- Founded: 23 March 1946
- Dissolved: 24 January 1948
- Preceded by: Liberal State Party
- Merged into: People's Party for Freedom and Democracy
- Ideology: Conservative liberalism Classical liberalism
- Political position: Centre-right
- International affiliation: Liberal International
- Colors: Blue

The Freedom Party (Dutch: Partij van de Vrijheid, PvdV) was a short-lived conservative liberal political party in the Netherlands active from 1946 to 1948. The PvdV was the successor of the Liberal State Party and a predecessor of the modern-day People's Party for Freedom and Democracy (VVD).

The Freedom party should not be confused with the modern Party for Freedom led by Geert Wilders.

== Party history ==
The PvdV was founded on 23 March 1946 by a group around the young liberal Korthals and the director of Heineken. After the foundation they were joined by the rest of the top of the pre-war Liberal State Party. The party was supposed to be less conservative and more modern that its predecessor. In 1948 it merged with social liberal dissidents from the Labour Party, led by Pieter Oud, to become the People's Party for Freedom and Democracy (VVD). In the 1946 elections it received six seats and it was confined to a minor position in opposition.

== Ideology and issues ==
The PvdV was classical liberal party with progressive leanings, committed to individual freedom and free market economics.

== Representation ==
This table shows the PvdV's results in elections to the House of Representatives, Senate and States-Provincial, as well as the party's political leadership: the fractievoorzitter, is the chair of the parliamentary party and the lead candidate is the party's top candidate in the general election, these posts are normally taken by the party's leader.

Year	HoR	S	SP	Parliamentary leader	Lead candidate
1946	6	3	37	Steven Bierema	multiple including Bierema
1947	6	3	37	Steven Bierema	no elections

== Electorate ==
The PvdV mainly received support from atheists or latitudinarian Protestants from higher classes: businessmen, civil servants, wealthy farmers, and voters with free professions (such as lawyers and doctors). The party performed particularly well in the major trading cities Amsterdam and Rotterdam, the rich municipalities around Hilversum and The Hague and in northern rural provinces, like Groningen and Drenthe.

== Pillarisation ==
The PvdV lacked a real system of pillarized organisations around it. 'Neutral' organisations, which were not linked to a pillar, often had friendly relations with the PvdV. This included the general broadcasting association AVRO (Algemene Verenigde Radio Omroep, General United Radio Broadcasting Organisation), the neutral employers' organisation VNO and the financial paper Het Handelsblad had good relations with the party.

== See also ==
- Liberalism in the Netherlands
- Democrats 66
