= Rad Kortenhorst =

Dutch politician

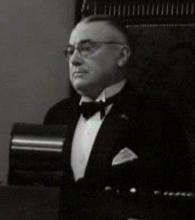
Kortenhorst in 1951

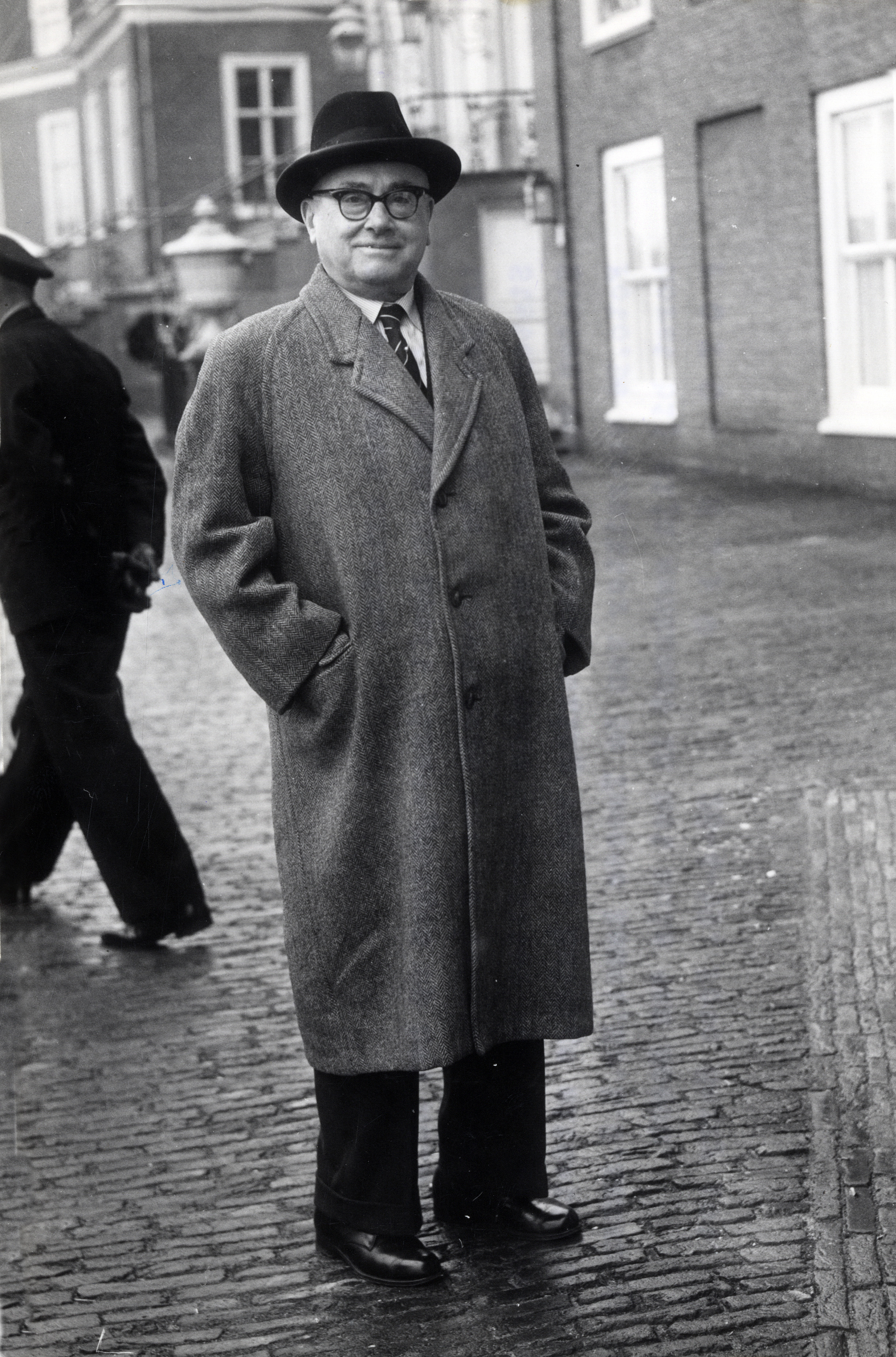
Kortenhorst in 1959

Leonardus Gerardus (Rad) Kortenhorst (12 November 1886 – 13 January 1963) was a Dutch politician for the Catholic People's Party (KVP). He was president of the House of Representatives of the Netherlands from 12 August 1948 to 13 January 1963.

Political offices
Preceded by Josef van Schaik	Speaker of the House of Representatives; 1948–1963	Succeeded by Frans-Jozef van Thiel
