= List of recipients of the Order of the Netherlands Lion =

Recipients of the Order of the Netherlands Lion and, until 1830, its counterpart the Order of the Lion Belgium.

The Order of the Netherlands Lion is a high order of chivalry of the Kingdom of the Netherlands. The Order of the Netherlands Lion was until recently awarded upon eminent individuals from all walks of life, including generals, ministers of the crown, mayors of large towns, professors and leading scientists, industrialists, high ranking civil servants, presiding judges and renowned artists. Since 1980 the Order has been primarily used to recognise merit in the arts, science, sport and literature. The following are recipients within the award.

== Knight Grand Cross ==
=== Royalty ===
(List incomplete)

Nationality	Military Rank	Name	Date	Royal function(s)/Political offices(s)	Military offices(s)	Comments
(United Kingdom) (German Empire)	Admiral of the Fleet	Alfred, Duke of Saxe-Coburg and Gotha	1865		Commander-in-Chief, Plymouth (1890–1893); Commander-in-Chief, Mediterranean Fleet (1886–1889); Commander-in-Chief, Channel Fleet (1883–1884)	
(Ottoman Empire)	Pasha	Khedive Isma'il of Egypt	1866	Khedive of Egypt and Sudan (1863–1879)		
(United Kingdom)	Field marshal	Prince Arthur, Duke of Connaught and Strathearn	23 August 1878	Governor General of Canada (1911–1916)		
(Ottoman Empire)	Pasha	Khedive Abbas II of Egypt	1892	Khedive of Egypt and Sudan (1892–1914)		
(Netherlands)	Lieutenant general	Prince Henry, Duke of Mecklenburg-Schwerin	7 February 1901	Prince consort of the Netherlands (1901–1934)		
(Kingdom of Egypt)		King Fuad I of Egypt	1925	King of Egypt (1922–1936); Sultan of Egypt (1917–1922)		
(Netherlands)		Queen Juliana of the Netherlands	30 April 1927	Queen of the Netherlands (1948–1980)		Former Grand Master (04/09/1948–30/04/1980)
(Thailand)	General	Tisavarakumarn, the Prince Damrong Rajanubhab	8 August 1930	Prince of Thailand (1862–1943)	Commanders-in-chief of the Royal Siamese Army (1887–1890)	
(Ethiopian Empire)		Emperor Haile Selassie of Ethiopia	7 October 1930	Emperor of Ethiopia (1930–1974)		
(Netherlands)	General Lieutenant admiral	Prince Bernhard of Lippe-Biesterfeld	7 January 1937	Prince consort of the Netherlands (1948–1980)	Inspector General of the Armed forces of the Netherlands (1970–1976); Inspector General of the Royal Netherlands Air Force (1953–1970); Inspector General of the Royal Netherlands Navy (1946–1970); Inspector General of the Royal Netherlands Army (1945–1970); Commander-in-chief of the Armed forces of the Netherlands (1944–1945)	Husband of Queen Juliana of the Netherlands
(United Kingdom)	Admiral of the Fleet	Louis Mountbatten, 1st Earl Mountbatten of Burma	1948	Governor-General of India (1947–1948); Viceroy of India (1947)	Chief of the Defence Staff (1959–1965); Chairman of the NATO Military Committee (1960–1961); First Sea Lord (1955–1959); Commander-in-Chief of the Mediterranean Fleet (1952–1954); Fourth Sea Lord (1950–1952)	
(United Kingdom)		Queen Elizabeth The Queen Mother	1950	Queen consort of the United Kingdom (1936–1952); Empress consort of India (1936–1947)		Wife of King George VI of the United Kingdom
(United Kingdom)		Queen Elizabeth II of the United Kingdom	1950	Queen of the United Kingdom (1952–2022)		
(Netherlands)		Princess Beatrix of the Netherlands	31 January 1956	Queen of the Netherlands (1980–2013)		Former Grand Master (30/04/1980–30/04/2013)
(Netherlands)		Princess Irene of the Netherlands	5 August 1957			
(United Kingdom)	Field marshal Admiral of the Fleet	Prince Philip, Duke of Edinburgh	26 March 1958	Consort of the United Kingdom (1952-2021)	Lord High Admiral (2011-2021); Air commodore-in-chief of the Air Training Corps (1953–2015)	Husband of Queen Elizabeth II of the United Kingdom, died 9 April 2021
(Pahlavi Iran)		Mohammad Reza Shah Pahlavi	19 May 1959	Shah of Iran (1941–1979)		
(Netherlands)		Prince Claus of the Netherlands	10 March 1966	Prince consort of the Netherlands (1980–2002)		Husband of Queen Beatrix of the Netherlands
(Thailand)	Field marshal Admiral of the fleet Marshal of the air force	King Bhumibol Adulyadej of Thailand	12 May 1960	King of Thailand (1946–2016)	Head of the Royal Thai Armed Forces (1946–2016)	
(Thailand)	Field marshal Admiral of the fleet Marshal of the air force	Queen Sirikit The Queen Mother	12 May 1960	Queen consort of Thailand (1950–2016)	Special commander of the 21st Infantry Regiment, Queen's Guard (since 1959)	Wife of King Rama IX of Thailand
(Netherlands)		Princess Margriet of the Netherlands	19 January 1961			
(Jordan)		King Hussein of Jordan	1964	King of Jordan (1952–1999)		
(Netherlands)		Princess Christina of the Netherlands	18 February 1965			
(Netherlands)	Brigadier general Commodore	King Willem-Alexander of the Netherlands	27 April 1985	King of the Netherlands (since 2013)		Grand Master (30/04/2013)
(Netherlands)		Prince Friso of Orange-Nassau	25 September 1986			
(Netherlands)		Prince Constantijn of the Netherlands	11 October 1987			
(Japan)		Emperor Akihito of Japan	22 October 1991	Emperor of Japan (1989-2019)		
(Japan)		Empress Michiko of Japan	22 October 1991	Empress consort of Japan (1989-2019)		Wife of Emperor Akihito of Japan
(Argentina) (Netherlands)		Queen Máxima of the Netherlands	2 February 2002	Queen consort of the Netherlands (since 2013)		Wife of King Willem-Alexander of the Netherlands
(Netherlands)	Captain	Pieter van Vollenhoven	29 April 2004			Husband of Princess Margriet of the Netherlands
(Belgium)		King Albert II of Belgium	20 June 2006	King of the Belgians (1993–2013)		
(Belgium)		Queen Paola of Belgium	20 June 2006	Queen consort of the Belgians (1993–2013)		Wife of King Albert II of Belgium
(Qatar)		Sheikh Hamad bin Khalifa Al Thani of Qatar	9 March 2011	Emir of Qatar (1995–2013); Prime Minister of Qatar (1995–1996)		
(Netherlands)		Catharina-Amalia, Princess of Orange	7 December 2021	Princess of Orange (since 2013)		
(Netherlands)		Princess Alexia of the Netherlands	26 June 2023			
(Belgium)		King Baudouin of Belgium	Unknown	King of the Belgians (1951–1993)		
(United Kingdom)	Major	Prince Albert Victor, Duke of Clarence and Avondale	Unknown			
(Sweden)		King Gustaf VI Adolf of Sweden	Unknown	King of Sweden (1950–1973)		
(Sweden)		King Carl XVI Gustaf of Sweden	Unknown	King of Sweden (since 1973)		
(United Kingdom)		King George V of the United Kingdom	Unknown	King of the United Kingdom (1936–1952); Emperor of India (1936–1947)		
(Norway)		King Haakon VII of Norway	Unknown	King of Norway (1905−1957)		
(Norway)		King Harald V of Norway	Unknown	King of Norway (since 1991)		
(German Empire)	Grand admiral	Prince Henry of Prussia	Unknown		Commander-in-Chief of High Seas; Fleet of the Imperial German Navy (1907−1909)	
(Denmark)		Queen Margrethe II of Denmark	Unknown	Queen of Denmark (1972-2024)		
(Denmark)		Prince Henrik of Denmark	Unknown	Prince consort of Denmark (1972-2018)		Husband of Queen Margrethe II of Denmark, died 13 February 2018
(Sweden) (Denmark)		Queen Ingrid of Sweden	Unknown	Queen consort of Denmark (1947–1972)		Wife of King Frederick IX of Denmark

=== Politics and Military ===
(List incomplete)

Nationality	Military Rank	Name	Date	Political offices(s)	Military offices(s)	Comments
(Netherlands)	General	Godert van der Capellen	14 February 1821	Governor-General of the Dutch East Indies (1816–1826)	Commander-in-chief of the Royal Netherlands East Indies Army (1819)	Elevated to Knight Grand Cross from Commander (17/11/1817)
(Netherlands)		Jan Jacob Rochussen	10 October 1841	Prime Minister of the Netherlands (1858–1860); Governor-General of the Dutch East Indies (1845–1851)		Elevated to Knight Grand Cross from Commander (28/11/1840); Elevated to Commander from Knight (04/07/1829)
(Netherlands)		Floris Adriaan van Hall	2 April 1844	Prime Minister of the Netherlands (1853–1856, 1860–1861)		
(Netherlands)		Schelto van Heemstra	18 August 1860	Prime Minister of the Netherlands (1861–1862)		
(Netherlands)		Johan Rudolph Thorbecke	7 June 1863	Prime Minister of the Netherlands (1849–1853, 1862–1866, 1871–1872)		Elevated to Knight Grand Cross from Commander (14/01/1851)
(Netherlands)		Jan Heemskerk	1 May 1878	Prime Minister of the Netherlands (1874–1877, 1883–1888)		Elevated to Knight Grand Cross from Commander (25/09/1867)
(Netherlands)		Aeneas Mackay	27 May 1905	Prime Minister of the Netherlands (1888–1891); Speaker of the House of Representatives of the Netherlands (1884–1885, 1901–1905)		Elevated to Knight Grand Cross from Commander (17/02/1890)
(Mexico)	General	Porfirio Díaz	1908	President of Mexico (1876, 1877–1880, 1884–1911)		
(Netherlands)		Pieter Cort van der Linden	10 May 1926	Prime Minister of the Netherlands (1913–1918)		Elevated to Knight Grand Cross from Commander (1901)
(Netherlands)		Dirk Fock	7 September 1926	Governor-General of the Dutch East Indies (1921–1926); Speaker of the House of Representatives of the Netherlands (1917–1920); Governor of Suriname (1908–1911)		Elevated to Knight Grand Cross from Commander (10/10/1920)
(Czechoslovakia)		Tomáš Masaryk	1929	President of Czechoslovakia (1918–1935)		
(Netherlands)	Major	Hendrikus Colijn	6 January 1937	Prime Minister of the Netherlands (1925–1926, 1933–1939)		Elevated to Knight Grand Cross from Commander (30/08/1926)
(Netherlands)		Willem Lodewijk de Vos van Steenwijk	30 August 1938	President of the Senate of the Netherlands (1929–1946)		Elevated to Knight Grand Cross from Commander (30/08/1933)
(United States)	General of the Army	Dwight D. Eisenhower	6 October 1945	President of the United States (1953–1961)	Supreme Allied Commander Europe (1951–1952); Chief of Staff of the United States Army (1945–1948)	
(Netherlands)	General	Henri Winkelman	14 April 1946		Commander-in-chief of the Armed forces of the Netherlands (1940)	
(Netherlands)	Captain	Pieter Sjoerds Gerbrandy	6 May 1946	Prime Minister of the Netherlands (1940–1945)		Elevated to Knight Grand Cross from Knight (28/08/1930)
(United Kingdom)	Lieutenant colonel	Sir Winston Churchill	1946	Prime Minister of the United Kingdom (1940–1945, 1951–1955)		
(United Kingdom)	Field marshal	Bernard Montgomery, 1st Viscount; Montgomery of Alamein	16 January 1947		Chief of the Imperial General Staff (1946–1948)	
(Netherlands)		Roelof Kranenburg	4 September 1948	President of the Senate of the Netherlands (1946–1951)		Elevated to Knight Grand Cross from Knight (30/08/1939)
(Netherlands)		Willem Drees	22 December 1958	Prime Minister of the Netherlands (1948–1958)		
(West Germany)		Konrad Adenauer	1960	Chancellor of Germany (1949–1963)		
(West Germany)		Walter Hallstein	1968	President of the European Commission (1958–1967)		
(Indonesia)	Grand General	Suharto	1970	President of Indonesia (1967–1998)	Commander of the Indonesian National Armed Forces (1968–1973); Chief of Staff of the Indonesian Army (1965–1968)	
(Socialist Federal Republic of Yugoslavia)	Marshal	Josip Broz Tito	20 October 1970	President of Yugoslavia (1953–1980); Prime Minister of Yugoslavia (1944–1963)		
(Netherlands)		Louis Beel	28 June 1972	Vice President of the Council of State of the Netherlands (1959–1972); Prime Minister of the Netherlands (1946–1948, 1958–1959)		
(Netherlands)		Sicco Mansholt	18 December 1972	President of the European Commission (1972–1973); European Commissioner for Agriculture (1958–1972)		Elevated to Knight Grand Cross from Commander (7 January 1958)
(Netherlands)	Lieutenant	Jelle Zijlstra	18 November 1981	Prime Minister of the Netherlands (1966–1967)		Elevated to Knight Grand Cross from Commander (27 July 1963)
(West Germany)		Richard von Weizsäcker	1987	President of Germany (1984–1994)		
(Netherlands)	Second lieutenant	Ruud Lubbers	8 October 1994	United Nations High Commissioner for Refugees (2001–2005); Prime Minister of the Netherlands (1982–1994)		Elevated to Knight Grand Cross from Knight (11/04/1978)
(Ghana)		Kofi Annan	2006	Secretary-General of the United Nations (1997–2006)		
(Slovakia)		Ivan Gašparovič	21 May 2007	President of Slovakia (1998, 2004–2014); Speaker of the National Council of Slovakia (1992–1998)		
(Lithuania)		Valdas Adamkus	2008	President of Lithuania (1998–2003, 2004–2009)		
(Estonia)		Toomas Hendrik Ilves	2008	President of Estonia (2006–2016)		
(Poland)		Lech Wałęsa	2008	President of Poland (1990–1995)		
(Turkey)		Abdullah Gül	17 April 2012	President of Turkey (2007–2014); Prime Minister of Turkey (2002–2003)		
(Italy)		Giorgio Napolitano	23 October 2012	President of Italy (2006–2015); President of the Chamber of Deputies of Italy (1992–1994)		
(France)		François Hollande	20 January 2014	President of France (2012–2017)		
(South Korea)		Ban Ki-moon	19 April 2016	Secretary-General of the United Nations (2007–2016)		
(Germany)		Joachim Gauck	7 February 2017	President of Germany (2012–2017)		
(Argentina)		Mauricio Macri	26 April 2017	President of Argentina (2015–2019)		
(Netherlands)		Mark Rutte	2 June 2024	Prime Minister of the Netherlands (2010–2024)		
(Netherlands)	Lieutenant admiral	Conrad Helfrich	Unknown		Commander of the Royal Netherlands Navy (1945–1948); Commander of the ABDACOM Naval Forces (1942)	
(United States)	General	Walter Bedell Smith	Unknown	United States Ambassador to the Soviet Union (1946–1948)	Commander of the First United States Army (1949–1950)	
(Germany)		Helmut Kohl	Unknown	Chancellor of Germany (1982–1998)		
(Netherlands)	Seaman	Joseph Luns	Unknown	Secretary General of NATO (1971–1984)		
(Netherlands)		Cardinal Johannes de Jong	Unknown	Archbishop of Utrecht (1936–1955)		
(Finland)		Martti Ahtisaari	Unknown	President of Finland (1994–2000)		
(Union of South Africa)	Field marshal	Jan Smuts	Unknown	Prime Minister of South Africa (1919–1924, 1939–1948)		
(United Kingdom)	Field marshal	Alan Brooke, 1st Viscount Alanbrooke	Unknown		Chief of the Imperial General Staff (1941–1946); Commander-in-Chief, Home Forces (1940–1941); Commander-in-Chief, Southern Command (1939, 1940)	
(Netherlands)		Gijsbert Karel van Hogendorp	Unknown	Vice President of the Council of State of the Netherlands (1814–1816)		
(Netherlands)		Cardinal Bernardus Johannes Alfrink	Unknown	Archbishop of Utrecht (1955–1975)		
(United Kingdom)	Major-general	Alexander Cambridge, 1st Earl of Athlone	Unknown	Governor General of Canada (1940–1946); Governor-General of the Union of South Africa (1924–1930)		
(United Kingdom)	Admiral of the Fleet	Andrew Cunningham, 1st Viscount; Cunningham of Hyndhop	Unknown	Lord High Steward (1953)	First Sea Lord (1943–1946)	
(Belgium)		Charles de Broqueville	Unknown	Prime Minister of Belgium (1911–1918, 1932–1934)		

== Commander ==
(List incomplete)

Nationality	Military Rank	Name	Date	Royal function(s)/Political offices(s)	Military offices(s)	Comments
(Netherlands)		Jan Willem Louis van Oordt	1875	Tutor to William III in shipbuilding	Chief Engineer of the Royal Netherlands Navy	
(Netherlands)	Vice-admiral	Frederik Alexander Adolf Gregory	Unknown			
(Netherlands)	General	Godfried van Voorst tot Voorst	Unknown		Second highest officer in command of the Dutch armed forces during World War II	Commander

== Knight ==
(List incomplete)

Nationality	Military Rank	Name	Date	Royal function(s)/Political offices(s)	Military offices(s)	Comments
(Dutch East Indies)		Soeria Atmadja	1918	Politician, Regent of Sumedang (1883-1919).		Knight
(Netherlands) (United States)		Edward Bok	1924	Philanthropist, publisher, editor of Ladies' Home Journal, Pulitzer Prize winning author		Knight
(Netherlands)	Vice admiral	Jean Jacques Rambonnet	1924	Politician, Minister of the Navy, acting Minister of the Colonies, acting Minister of War, Chief Scout of the Netherlands	Naval officer	Knight
(Netherlands) (Indonesia)		Hok Hoei Kan	1930	Politician and community leader of the Dutch East Indies, member of the Volksraad		Knight
(Netherlands)	Lieutenant admiral	Johan Furstner		Politician, Minister of the Navy	Naval officer, Chief of the Naval Staff, Commander-in-Chief of the Naval Forces	Knight
(Netherlands)		Jacobus Thomas (Tom) de Smidt	1985	Academic in the field of Legal history		Knight
(Netherlands)		Dick Swaab	1998	Neurobiologist and founder of the Netherlands Brain Bank		Knight
(Netherlands)		André Rieu	2002	Violinist and conductor of the Johann Strauss Orchestra		Knight
(Netherlands) (Denmark)		Børge Ring	2003	Animated short film writer, director and animator		Knight
(Netherlands)		Hans van Houwelingen	2008	Academic, mathematician in the field of medical statistics, biostatistics		Knight
(Netherlands)		Willem de Vos	2017	Academic, microbiologist		Knight
(Netherlands)		Arjen Lucassen	2025	Singer, musician and music producer		Knight
