= First Beel cabinet =

Dutch cabinet, 1946 to 1948

- Cabinet of the Netherlands

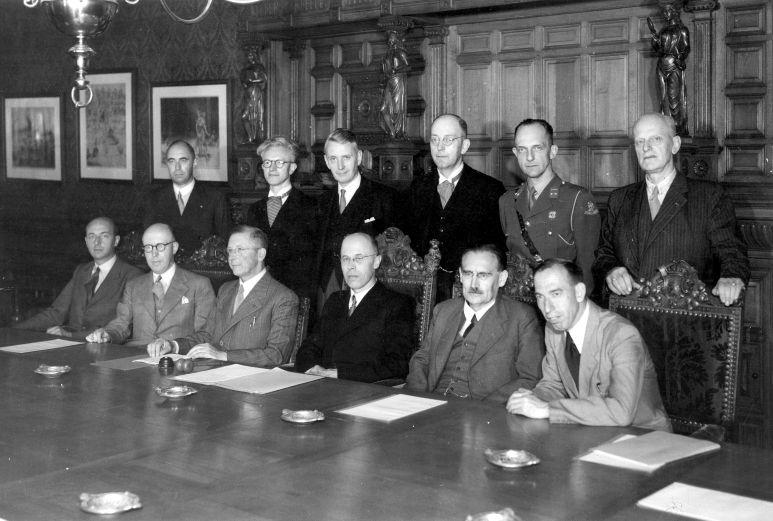
- First meeting of the cabinet at the Ministry of General Affairs on 3 July 1946
- Date formed: 3 July 1946
- Date dissolved: 7 August 1948; 2 years, 35 days in office (Demissionary from 7 July 1948)

People and organisations
- Monarch: Queen Wilhelmina
- Prime Minister: Louis Beel
- Deputy Prime Minister: Willem Drees
- No. of ministers: 17
- Ministers removed: 5
- Total no. of members: 19
- Member party: Catholic People's Party (KVP); Labour Party (PvdA)
- Status in legislature: Centre-left majority government (Roman/Red grand coalition)

History
- Incoming formation: 1946 formation
- Outgoing formation: 1948 formation
- Election: 1946 general election
- Outgoing election: 1948 general election
- Legislature terms: 1946–1948
- Predecessor: Schermerhorn–Drees cabinet
- Successor: Drees–Van Schaik cabinet

The First Beel cabinet was the cabinet of the Netherlands from 3 July 1946 until 7 August 1948. The cabinet was formed by the Christian democratic Catholic People's Party (KVP) and the social democratic Labour Party (PvdA) after the 1946 general election. The cabinet was a centre-left grand coalition and had a substantial majority in the House of Representatives with prominent Catholic politician Louis Beel serving as Prime Minister, and dual serving as Minister of the Interior continuing from the previous cabinet. Labour leader Willem Drees continued as Deputy Prime Minister and Minister of Social Affairs from the previous cabinet. According to one study, "Beel was of the opinion that a joint KVP–PvdA programme should be presented to other political groups. According to Beel, that programme should be socio-economically progressive, that is to say reform-oriented in favour of broad layers of the population. The socialists should not have to fear that a conservative wing within the KVP would rule the roost."

The cabinet served during the early years of the post-war 1940s. Domestically the beginning of the recovery and rebuilding following World War II continued with the Marshall Plan, it was also to implement several major social reforms to social security, including the Algemene Ouderdomswet. Internationally the beginning of the decolonization of the Dutch East Indies was continued. The cabinet suffered no major internal and external conflicts. Following a major revision of the Constitution, a snap election was called to simultaneously elect a new parliament. Following the election, the cabinet continued in a demissionary capacity until it was replaced by the Drees–Van Schaik cabinet.

== Term ==
A major issue was the independence of the Dutch East Indies. This required a change in the Constitution. In November 1946, the Linggadjati Agreement was signed, but different interpretations led to Dutch military intervention (the Police Actions). Under international pressure through the UN, this ended and negotiations restarted, ultimately resulting in the new country Indonesia, but only under the next cabinet, Drees I. An important new law was the Noodwet Ouderdomsvoorziening by Deputy Prime Minister and Minister of Social Affairs Willem Drees.

== Composition ==
Title	Minister			Term of office	
Title	Image	Name	Party	Start	End
Prime Minister	Louis Beel	Louis Beel	KVP	3 July 1946	7 August 1948
Minister of General Affairs	Louis Beel	Louis Beel	KVP	13 October 1947	7 August 1948
Deputy Prime Minister; Minister of Social Affairs	Willem Drees	Willem Drees	PvdA	3 July 1946	7 August 1948
Minister of the Interior	Louis Beel	Louis Beel	KVP	3 July 1946	15 September 1947
Minister of the Interior	Piet Witteman	Piet Witteman	KVP	15 September 1947	7 August 1948
Minister of Foreign Affairs	Pim van Boetzelaer van Oosterhout	Pim van Boetzelaer van Oosterhout	Indep.	3 July 1946	7 August 1948
Minister of Finance	Piet Lieftinck	Piet Lieftinck	PvdA	3 July 1946	7 August 1948
Minister of Justice	Johan van Maarseveen	Johan van Maarseveen	KVP	3 July 1946	7 August 1948
Minister of Economic Affairs	Gerardus Huysmans	Gerard Huysmans	KVP	3 July 1946	14 January 1948
Minister of Economic Affairs	Sicco Mansholt	Sicco Mansholt (ad interim)	PvdA	14 January 1948	20 January 1948
Minister of Economic Affairs	Jan van den Brink	Jan van den Brink	KVP	21 January 1948	7 August 1948
Minister of War	Alexander Fiévez	Alexander Fiévez	KVP	3 July 1946	7 August 1948
Minister of the Navy	Alexander Fiévez	Alexander Fiévez (ad interim)	KVP	3 July 1946	7 August 1946
Minister of the Navy	Jules Schagen van Leeuwen	Jules Schagen van Leeuwen	Indep.	7 August 1946	25 November 1947
Minister of the Navy	Alexander Fiévez	Alexander Fiévez (ad interim)	KVP	25 November 1947	7 August 1948
Minister of Education, Arts and Sciences	Jos Gielen	Jos Gielen	KVP	3 July 1946	7 August 1948
Minister of Transport (1946–1947); Minister of Transport and Water Management (1947–1948)	Hein Vos	Hein Vos	PvdA	3 July 1946	7 August 1948
Minister of Agriculture, Fisheries and Food Supplies	Sicco Mansholt	Sicco Mansholt	PvdA	3 July 1946	7 August 1948
Minister of Public Works and Reconstruction (1946–1947); Minister of Reconstruction and Housing (1947–1948)	Johan Ringers	Johan Ringers	Indep. Lib.	3 July 1946	15 November 1946
Minister of Public Works and Reconstruction (1946–1947); Minister of Reconstruction and Housing (1947–1948)	Hein Vos	Hein Vos (acting)	PvdA	15 November 1946	3 March 1947
Minister of Public Works and Reconstruction (1946–1947); Minister of Reconstruction and Housing (1947–1948)	Lambertus Neher	Lambertus Neher	PvdA	3 March 1947	1 March 1948
Minister of Public Works and Reconstruction (1946–1947); Minister of Reconstruction and Housing (1947–1948)	Joris in 't Veld	Joris in 't Veld	PvdA	1 March 1948	7 August 1948
Minister of Overseas Territories	Jan Jonkman	Jan Jonkman^{[Note]}	PvdA	3 July 1946	30 August 1947
Minister for Foreign Affairs	Eelco van Kleffens	Eelco van Kleffens	Indep.	3 July 1946	3 July 1947
Minister for Budgetary Affairs Overseas Territories	Lubbertus Götzen	Lubbertus Götzen	Indep. AR	11 November 1947	7 August 1948

^{Replaced by Louis Beel during a medical leave of absence from 30 August 1947 until 3 November 1947}
