= Minister of the Navy (Netherlands) =

- Minister van Marine
- Flag of the Minister of the Navy

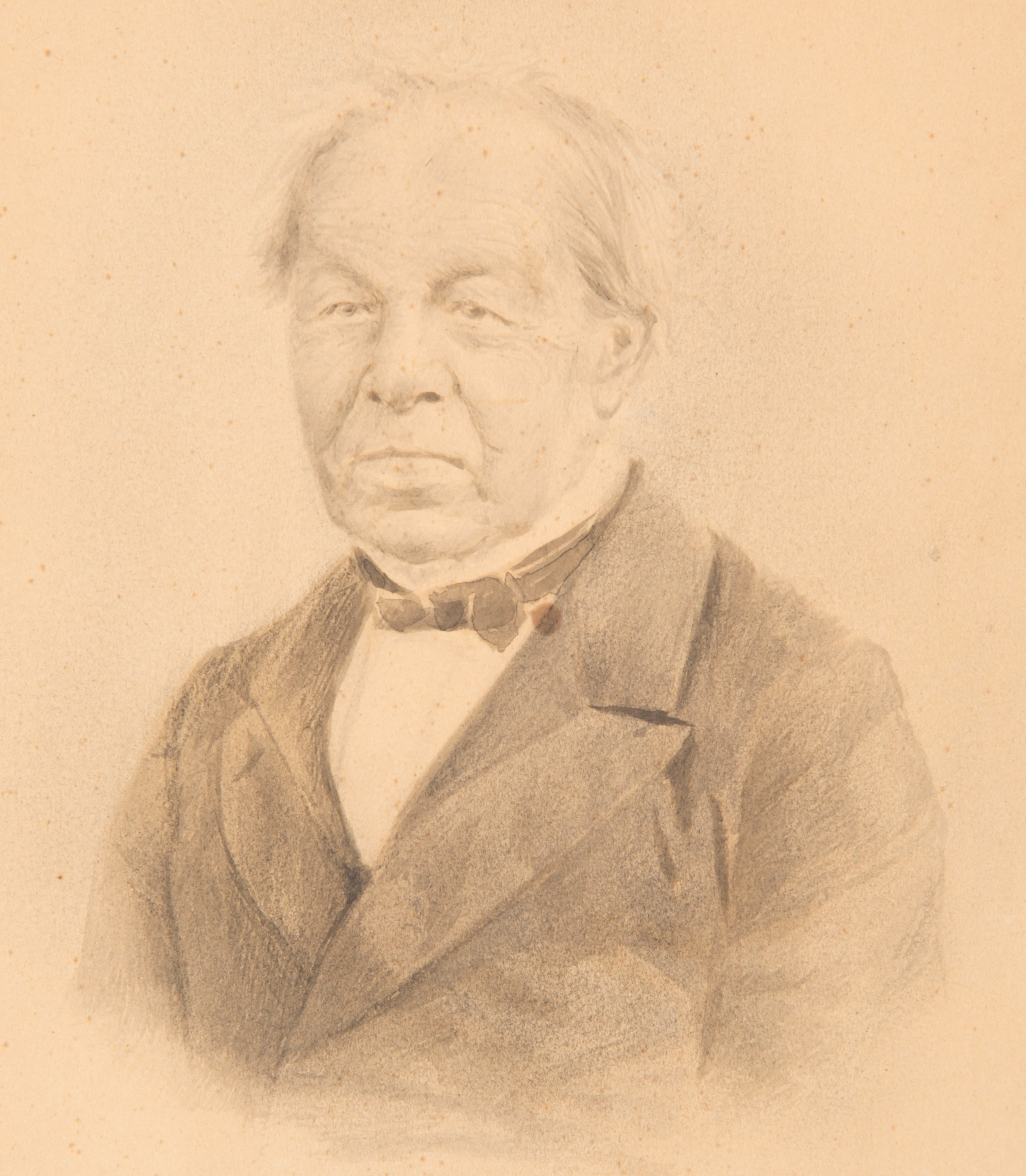
- Longest serving Lodewijk Gerard Brocx (4 June 1868–18 December 1873)
- Ministry of the Navy
- Member of: Council of Ministers; Cabinet
- Appointer: The Monarch
- Formation: 25 March 1848
- First holder: Charles Nepveu
- Final holder: Alexander Fiévez
- Abolished: 7 August 1948
- Superseded by: Minister of Defence
- Deputy: State Secretary for Navy

The minister of the navy (Dutch: Minister van Marine) of the Netherlands was the minister responsible for the Ministry of the Navy and the Royal Netherlands Navy. Created in 1855, the position was abolished with the creation of the position of Minister of Defence in 1928, then reestablished in 1941 upon the abolition of the Ministry of Defence. When the Ministry of Defence was reestablished in 1948, the position of Minister of the Navy again was abolished.

The first minister of the navy was Abraham Johannes de Smit van den Broecke, while the last one was Alexander Fiévez, a member of the Catholic People's Party.

== List of officeholders ==
Minister of the Navy		Term of office	Party	Prime Minister (Cabinet)
	Captain; Abraham Johannes de Smit van den Broecke (1801–1875)	8 February 1855 – 1 July 1856	Independent; Conservative (Liberal Conservative)	Floris Adriaan van Hall (Van Hall-Donker Curtius)
	Captain; Abraham Johannes de Smit van den Broecke (1801–1875)	1 July 1856 – 1 August 1856 ^{[Ad interim]}	Independent; Conservative (Liberal Conservative)	Justinus van der Brugghen (Van der Brugghen)
Johannes Servaas Lotsy	Johannes Servaas Lotsy (1808–1863)	1 August 1856 – 18 March 1858	(Liberal)	Justinus van der Brugghen (Van der Brugghen)
Johannes Servaas Lotsy	Johannes Servaas Lotsy (1808–1863)	18 March 1858 – 23 February 1860	(Liberal)	Jan Jacob Rochussen (Rochussen)
Johannes Servaas Lotsy	Johannes Servaas Lotsy (1808–1863)	23 February 1860 – 14 March 1861	(Liberal)	Floris Adriaan van Hall (Van Hall Van Heemstra)
Willem Huyssen van Kattendijke	Willem Huyssen van Kattendijke (1816–1866)	14 March 1861 – 1 February 1862	(Liberal)	Jacob van Zuylen van Nijevelt (Van Zuylen van Nijevelt Van Haemstra)
Willem Huyssen van Kattendijke	Willem Huyssen van Kattendijke (1816–1866)	1 February 1862 – 6 February 1866	(Liberal)	Johan Rudolph Thorbecke (Thorbecke II)
	Lieutenant General; Johan Wilhelm Blanken (1806–1880)	6 February 1866 – 10 February 1866^{[Ad interim]}	(Liberal)	Johan Rudolph Thorbecke (Thorbecke II)
	Lieutenant General; Johan Wilhelm Blanken (1806–1880)	10 February 1866 – 1 June 1866^{[Ad interim]}	(Liberal)	Isaäc Dignus Fransen van de Putte (Fransen van de Putte)
Pels Rijcken	Vice admiral Pels Rijcken (1810–1889)	1 June 1866 – 4 June 1868	Independent; Conservative (Liberal Conservative)	Jules van Zuylen van Nijevelt (Van Zuylen van Nijevelt)
Lodewijk Gerard Brocx	Lodewijk Gerard Brocx (1819–1880)	4 June 1868 – 18 December 1873^{[Res]}	Independent; Liberal (Classical Liberal)	Pieter Philip van Bosse (Van Bosse–Fock)
Lodewijk Gerard Brocx	Lodewijk Gerard Brocx (1819–1880)	4 June 1868 – 18 December 1873^{[Res]}	Independent; Liberal (Classical Liberal)	Johan Rudolph Thorbecke (Thorbecke III)
Lodewijk Gerard Brocx	Lodewijk Gerard Brocx (1819–1880)	4 June 1868 – 18 December 1873^{[Res]}	Independent; Liberal (Classical Liberal)	Gerrit de Vries (De Vries–Fransen van de Putte)
Isaäc Dignus Fransen van de Putte	Isaäc Dignus Fransen van de Putte (Minister of Colonial Affairs) (1822–1902)	18 December 1873 – 16 May 1874^{[Ad interim]}	Independent; Liberal (Social Liberal)	Gerrit de Vries (De Vries–Fransen van de Putte)
Willem van Erp Taalman Kip	Willem van Erp Taalman Kip (1824–1905)	16 May 1874 – 3 November 1877	Independent; Liberal (Conservative Liberal)	Gerrit de Vries (De Vries–Fransen van de Putte)
Hendrikus Wichers	Jonkheer; Captain; Hendrikus Wichers (1831–1889)	3 November 1877 – 20 August 1879	Independent; Liberal (Classical Liberal)	Jan Kappeyne van de Coppello (Kappeyne van de Coppello)
Willem van Erp Taalman Kip	Willem van Erp Taalman Kip (1824–1905)	20 August 1879 – 23 April 1883	Independent; Liberal (Conservative Liberal)	Theo van Lynden van Sandenburg (Van Lynden van Sandenburg)
Frederik Lambertus Geerling	Vice admiral Frederik Geerling (1815–1894)	23 April 1883 – 19 April 1884^{[Res]}	Independent; Conservative (Liberal Conservative)	Jan Heemskerk (J. Heemskerk)
Willem van Erp Taalman Kip	Willem van Erp Taalman Kip (1824–1905)	19 April 1884 – 5 August 1885^{[Res]}	Independent; Liberal (Conservative Liberal)	Jan Heemskerk (J. Heemskerk)
	Rear admiral Willem Gericke (1836–1914)	5 August 1885 – 26 January 1887^{[Res]}	Independent; Conservative (Liberal Conservative)	Jan Heemskerk (J. Heemskerk)
Frederik Cornelis Tromp	Frederik Cornelis Tromp (1828–1900)	26 January 1887 – 21 April 1888	Independent; Liberal (Conservative Liberal)	Jan Heemskerk (J. Heemskerk)
Hendrik Dyserinck	Rear admiral Hendrik Dyserinck (1838–1906)	21 April 1888 – 31 March 1891^{[Res]}	Independent; Conservative (Liberal Conservative)	Aeneas Mackay (Mackay)
Gerhardus Kruys	Rear admiral Gerhardus Kruys (1846–1916)	31 March 1891 – 21 August 1891	Independent; Christian Democrat (Protestant)	Aeneas Mackay (Mackay)
Joannes Coenraad Jansen	Joannes Coenraad; Jansen (1840–1925)	21 August 1891 – 9 May 1894	Liberal Union	Gijsbert van Tienhoven (Van Tienhoven)
Herman van der Wijck	Jonkheer; Herman van der Wijck (1843–1932)	9 May 1894 – 27 July 1897	Independent; Liberal (Classical Liberal)	Joan Röell (Röell)
Joannes Coenraad Jansen	Joannes Coenraad; Jansen (1840–1925)	27 July 1897 – 22 December 1897^{[Res]}	Liberal Union	Nicolaas Pierson (Pierson)
Kornelis Eland	Lieutenant general Kornelis Eland (Minister of War) (1838–1927)	22 December 1897 – 12 January 1898^{[Ad interim]}	Liberal Union	Nicolaas Pierson (Pierson)
Jacob Röell	Vice admiral Jonkheer; Jacob Röell (1846–1935)	12 January 1898 – 1 August 1901	Independent; Liberal (Classical Liberal)	Nicolaas Pierson (Pierson)
Gerhardus Kruys	Vice admiral Gerhardus Kruys (1846–1916)	1 August 1901 – 12 December 1902^{[Died]}	Independent; Christian Democrat (Protestant)	Abraham Kuyper (Kuyper)
Johannes Bergansius	Lieutenant general Johannes Bergansius (Minister of War) (1836–1913)	12 December 1902 – 16 March 1903^{[Ad interim]}	Independent; Christian Democrat (Catholic)	Abraham Kuyper (Kuyper)
Abraham George Ellis	Vice admiral Abraham George Ellis (1846–1916)	16 March 1903 – 17 August 1905	Independent; Conservative (Liberal Conservative)	Abraham Kuyper (Kuyper)
William Cohen Stuart	Captain; William Cohen Stuart (1857–1935)	17 August 1905 – 5 August 1907^{[Res]}	Independent; Liberal (Classical Liberal)	Theo de Meester (De Meester)
Jan Wentholt	Vice admiral Jan Wentholt (1851–1931)	5 August 1907 – 14 May 1912^{[Res]}	Independent; Liberal (Classical Liberal)	Theo de Meester (De Meester)
Jan Wentholt	Vice admiral Jan Wentholt (1851–1931)	5 August 1907 – 14 May 1912^{[Res]}	Independent; Liberal (Classical Liberal)	Theo Heemskerk (T. Heemskerk)
Hendrikus Colijn	Major; Hendrikus Colijn (also Minister of War) (1869–1944)	14 May 1912 – 29 August 1913	Anti-Revolutionary Party	Theo Heemskerk (T. Heemskerk)
Jean Jacques Rambonnet	Rear admiral Jean Jacques; Rambonnet (1864–1943)	29 August 1913 – 28 June 1918^{[Res]}	Independent; Liberal (Classical Liberal)	Pieter Cort van der Linden (Cort van der Linden)
Bonifacius Cornelis de Jonge	Jonkheer; Bonifacius Cornelis de Jonge (Minister of War) (1875–1958)	28 June 1918 – 9 September 1918^{[Ad interim]}	Christian Historical Union	Pieter Cort van der Linden (Cort van der Linden)
George Alting von Geusau	Jonkheer; George Alting von Geusau (Minister of War) (1864–1937)	9 September 1918 – 16 September 1918^{[Ad interim]}	Roman Catholic; State Party	Charles Ruijs de Beerenbrouck (Ruijs de Beerenbrouck I)
Willem Naudin ten Cate	Vice admiral Willem Naudin ten Cate (1860–1942)	16 September 1918 – 19 February 1919^{[Res]}	Independent; Christian Democrat (Protestant)	Charles Ruijs de Beerenbrouck (Ruijs de Beerenbrouck I)
Charles Ruijs de Beerenbrouck	Jonkheer; Charles Ruijs de Beerenbrouck (Prime Minister) (1873–1936)	19 February 1919 – 19 April 1919^{[Ad interim]}	Roman Catholic; State Party	Charles Ruijs de Beerenbrouck (Ruijs de Beerenbrouck I)
Hendrik Bijleveld	Hendrik Bijleveld (1885–1954)	19 April 1919 – 5 January 1920^{[Res]}	Anti-Revolutionary Party	Charles Ruijs de Beerenbrouck (Ruijs de Beerenbrouck I)
Hendrik van IJsselsteyn	Hendrik van IJsselsteyn (Minister of Agriculture, Commerce and Industry) (1874–1942)	5 January 1920 – 31 March 1920^{[Ad interim]}	Independent; Christian Democrat (Protestant)	Charles Ruijs de Beerenbrouck (Ruijs de Beerenbrouck I)
Willem Frederik Pop	Lieutenant general Willem Frederik Pop (also Minister of War) (1858–1931)	31 March 1920 – 28 July 1921^{[Res]}	Independent	Charles Ruijs de Beerenbrouck (Ruijs de Beerenbrouck I)
Jannes van Dijk	Captain; Jannes van Dijk (also Minister of War) (1871–1954)	28 July 1921 – 18 September 1922	Anti-Revolutionary Party	Charles Ruijs de Beerenbrouck (Ruijs de Beerenbrouck I)
Evert Pieter Westerveld	Lieutenant commander Evert Pieter; Westerveld (1873–1964)	18 September 1922 – 4 August 1925	Independent; Liberal (Conservative Liberal)	Charles Ruijs de Beerenbrouck (Ruijs de Beerenbrouck II)
Johan Lambooij	Major; Johan Lambooij (also Minister of War) (1874–1942)	4 August 1925 – 8 March 1926	Roman Catholic; State Party	Hendrikus Colijn (Colijn I)
Louis van Royen	Captain; Louis van Royen (also Minister of War) (1865–1946)	8 March 1926 – 24 April 1926^{[Res]}	Independent; Liberal (Classical Liberal)	Dirk Jan de Geer (De Geer I)
Johan Lambooij	Major; Johan Lambooij (also Minister of War) (1874–1942)	24 April 1926 – 1 September 1928	Roman Catholic; State Party	Dirk Jan de Geer (De Geer I)
No minister of the navy (1928–1941)
Johan Furstner	Lieutenant admiral Johan Furstner (1887–1970)	27 July 1941 – 23 February 1945	Independent; Conservative (Liberal Conservative)	Pieter Sjoerds Gerbrandy (Gerbrandy II)
Jim de Booy	Lieutenant commander Jim de Booy (1885–1969)	23 February 1945 – 3 July 1946	Independent; Liberal (Classical Liberal)	Pieter Sjoerds Gerbrandy (Gerbrandy III)
Jim de Booy	Lieutenant commander Jim de Booy (1885–1969)	23 February 1945 – 3 July 1946	Independent; Liberal (Classical Liberal)	Willem Schermerhorn (Schermerhorn–Drees)
Alexander Fiévez	Lieutenant colonel Alexander Fiévez (Minister of War) (1902–1949)	3 July 1946 – 7 August 1946^{[Ad interim]}	Catholic People's Party	Louis Beel (Beel I)
Jules Schagen van Leeuwen	Lieutenant commander Jules Schagen van Leeuwen (1896–1976)	7 August 1946 – 25 November 1947^{[Res]}	Independent; Conservative (Social Conservative)	Louis Beel (Beel I)
Alexander Fiévez	Lieutenant colonel Alexander Fiévez (also Minister of War) (1902–1949)	25 November 1947 – 7 August 1948	Catholic People's Party	Louis Beel (Beel I)

^{Resigned}
^{Acting}
^{Ad Interim}

== See also ==
- List of ministers of defence of the Netherlands
- Minister of War
