= Johan Furstner =

Dutch politician

Lieutenant Admiral Johan Furstner
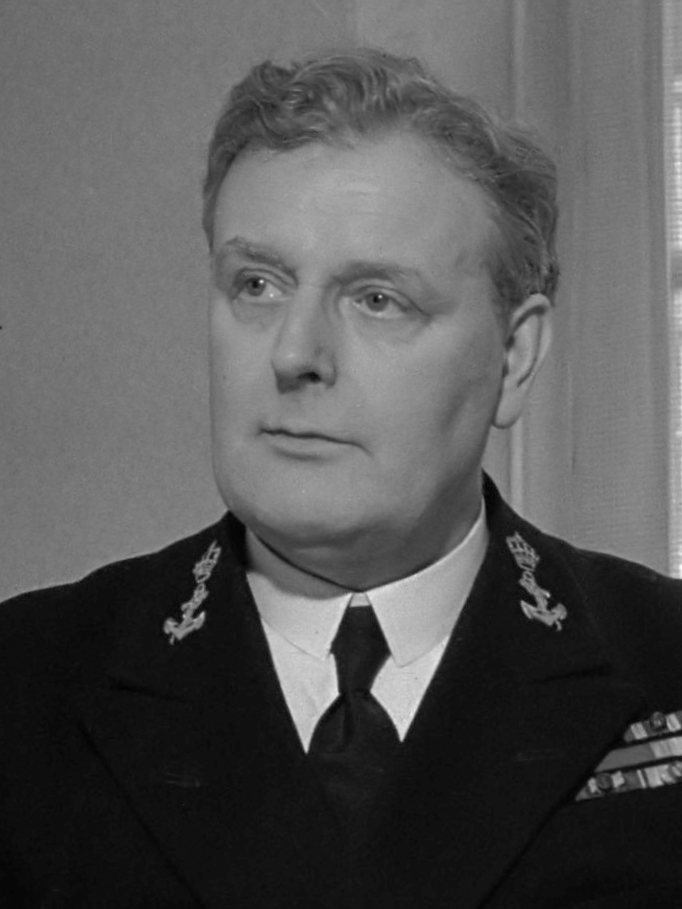
- Furstner sometime between 1941 and 1945

Member of the Council of State
- In office 25 August 1945 – 1 January 1963
- Monarch: Queen Wilhelmina

Minister of the Navy
- In office 27 July 1941 – 23 February 1945
- Monarch: Queen Wilhelmina
- Prime Minister: Pieter Sjoerds Gerbrandy
- Preceded by: Hendrik van Boeijen
- Succeeded by: Jim de Booy

Personal details
- Born: 16 January 1887 Amsterdam, Netherlands
- Died: 15 September 1970 (aged 83) The Hague, Netherlands
- Party: Independent Liberal Conservative
- Education: Royal Naval Institute, Willemsoord
- Profession: Naval officer

Military service
- Allegiance: Netherlands
- Branch/service: Royal Netherlands Navy
- Years of service: 1906–1945
- Rank: Lieutenant admiral
- Commands: Hogere Marine Krijgsschool (director); HNLMS Hertog Hendrik; Chief of the Naval Staff; Commander of the Naval Forces
- Battles/wars: Sunda Islands Expedition (1905–1909); World War II

Johannes Theodorus Furstner (16 January 1887 – 15 September 1970) was a Dutch naval officer and politician. Reaching the rank of lieutenant admiral (Dutch: luitenant-admiraal), he served as Minister of the Navy during World War II in the Second Gerbrandy cabinet.

Furstner was a naval theorist and a central figure in the Royal Netherlands Navy from the late 1930s through the end of World War II in 1945. He was educated at the Hogere Krijgsschool (English: Higher Military School) and the French École supérieure de guerre (English: Superior School of warfare). Although he was a co-founder of the Alliance for National Reconstruction (Dutch: Verbond voor Nationaal Herstel), he had little interest in the pre-World War II Dutch political party system. When Nazi Germany overran the Netherlands in May 1940, he moved to London to continue service in the Dutch government-in-exile there, although he was indignant about the Dutch cabinet's decision to flee the Netherlands. From 1941 to 1945, he served simultaneously as both Minister of the Navy and as commander-in-chief of the Royal Netherlands Navy in the Dutch government-in-exile in London. After World War II he was a member of the Council of State for more than 17 years.

== Youth and education ==
Furstner was born on 18 January 1887 in Amsterdam, where he also attended Hogere Burgerschool (Higher Civic School). He also received secondary education at the Institute "Wullings" in Voorschoten. From 1902 to 1906 he attended officer training at the Royal Naval Institute at Willemsoord in Den Helder.

== Career ==
=== Pre-World War II ===
Furstner was commissioned as a midshipman first class on 16 September 1906, and he was promoted to lieutenant (Dutch: luitenant ter zee der 2de klasse) on 16 September 1908. He served as a naval officer in the Netherlands East Indies at various times between 16 September 1908 and 1918, taking part in Dutch military expeditions in the Sunda Islands between 1905 and 1909.

During the period between 1912 and 1914, the Dutch Minister of the Navy, Jean Jacques Rambonnet, advocated that the Royal Netherlands Navy address the growing threat the Imperial Japanese Navy posed to the Netherlands East Indies by adopting a version of the "risk theory" developed by Admiral Alfred von Tirpitz for the Imperial German Navy. Rambonnet's version called for the maintenance of a Dutch fleet in the Netherlands East Indies large enough that it would outnumber the Japanese fleet when operating with the forces of a friendly power — which the Dutch hoped would be the United Kingdom or the United States — and be sufficient to deter or block any Japanese invasion. As a junior officer, Furstner assisted in the preparation of plans for a fleet of superdreadnoughts, cruisers, and submarines needed to pursue Rambonnet′s strategy. Shipyards in the Netherlands lacked the ability to construct ships larger than a cruiser, so the plan called for the construction of the superdreadnoughts in foreign yards. The outbreak of World War I in July 1914 made the procurement of superdreadnoughts impossible as belligerents focused the work in their shipyards on their own wartime needs, but Rambonnet nonetheless pursued the construction of cruisers and submarines, with plans calling for an altered strategy in which the cruisers would draw enemy forces into an ambush by Dutch submarines. The work of Rambonnet, Furstner, and others resulted in the construction of the Java-class light cruisers, six coastal submarines — three each of the O 9 and O 12 classes — and 12 larger patrol submarines of the K II, K III, K V, K VIII, and K XI classes.

Furstner received a promotion to lieutenant commander (Dutch: luitenant ter zee der 1ste klasse) on 1 September 1918. He then attended the Hogere Krijgsschool (English: Higher Military School) in The Hague from 1918 to 1920, when it became the Hogere Marine Krijgsschool (English: Naval War College). He remained there to serve as an instructor from 1 November 1921 to 21 August 1924. During the 1920s, he played an influential role in the Royal Netherlands Navy's development of submarine warfare tactics.

From 1925 to 1927, Furstner served as gunnery officer on the light cruiser HNLMS Java in the Netherlands East Indies. From 1927 to 1928 he pursued advanced naval theoretical studies at the École supérieure de guerre (English: Superior School of Warfare) in Paris, from which he received a brevet d' officers d'etat major (English: Staff Officer's Certificate). During his studies there, he came under the influence of French Navy admiral and military theorist Raoul Castex, who was a proponent of the work of United States Navy historian Captain Alfred Thayer Mahan and had developed ideas for how a smaller navy like that of the Netherlands could attack and defeat a larger opponent.

Furstner was promoted to commander (Dutch: kapitein-luitenant ter zee) on 14 December 1928 and in 1929 assumed duties as executive officer of the coastal defense ship HNLMS Jacob van Heemskerck. From 1930 to 1936, he served as director of the Hogere Marine Krijgsschool, receiving a promotion to captain (Dutch: kapitein ter zee) during his tour on 27 March 1933, and in that position he spread the naval theories he had developed in his studies under Castex among Royal Netherlands Navy officers attending the college. Despite his embrace of Rambonnet's strategy of using cruisers to draw enemy forces into a submarine ambush, he remained committed to the risk theory propounded by Rambonnet and to the eventual Dutch procurement of capital ships as Rambonnet had envisioned.

In 1932, Furstner co-founded the Alliance for National Reconstruction (Dutch: Verbond voor Nationaal Herstel, or VNH), a conservative-nationalist political party. However, during the 1930s he had little interest in the Dutch political party system, and he probably distanced himself from the VNH when he no longer approved of the party's positions on issues.

In 1935, Furstner became commanding officer of the coastal defense ship HNLMS Hertog Hendrik. He received a promotion to rear admiral (Dutch: schout-bij-nacht) on 1 January 1936, and on 1 July 1936 he became Chief of the Naval Staff in the Ministry of Defence. In this capacity he received a promotion to vice admiral (Dutch: vice-admiraal) on 1 January 1938 and was the central figure in Dutch naval planning and operations in the years immediately preceding World War II. Furstner viewed the Royal Netherlands Navy force in the Netherlands East Indies — three light cruisers, two torpedo cruisers, 12 destroyers, and 18 submarines — as inadequate for the defense of the islands. After learning of the German Kriegsmarine′s plans to operate three Deutschland-class Panzerschiffe (English: armored ships, nicknamed "pocket battleships" by the British) and two Scharnhorst-class battleships (often called "battlecruisers") and employ them in commerce raiding in a future war with the United Kingdom — a concept of operations intended to force the British Royal Navy to spread its capital ships out to escort convoys and weaken its main battlefleet, thereby deterring the British from entering a war against Germany — Furstner began to advocate the Dutch procurement of three battlecruisers for similar use against the Japanese in East Asia. Rather than rely on submarine ambushes as had been anticipated for 25 years, he planned to use the new battlecruisers in a more ambitious and risky version of Rambonnet's "risk theory," employing the battlecruisers in attacks on Japanese supply lines, the threat of which, in combination with the capabilities of the Royal Navy and United States Navy, he believed would deter Japan from attacks on the Netherlands East Indies.

Furstner submitted a note in December 1938 about naval defense needs in the Netherlands East Indies calling for the construction of the three battlecruisers and he and his supporters began openly campaigning for the adoption of his new version of a "risk theory" strategy in 1939. The effort was successful, and on 17 February 1939 the Dutch Ministry of Defence proposed the construction of the three battlecruisers, envisioning 26,000-ton ships armed with nine 28-centimetre (11 in) guns constructed in Nazi Germany and exploring design details in consultation with the German Kriegsmarine until as late as April 1940.

=== World War II ===
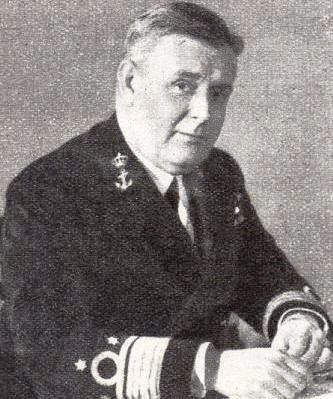
Johan Furstner in 1943.

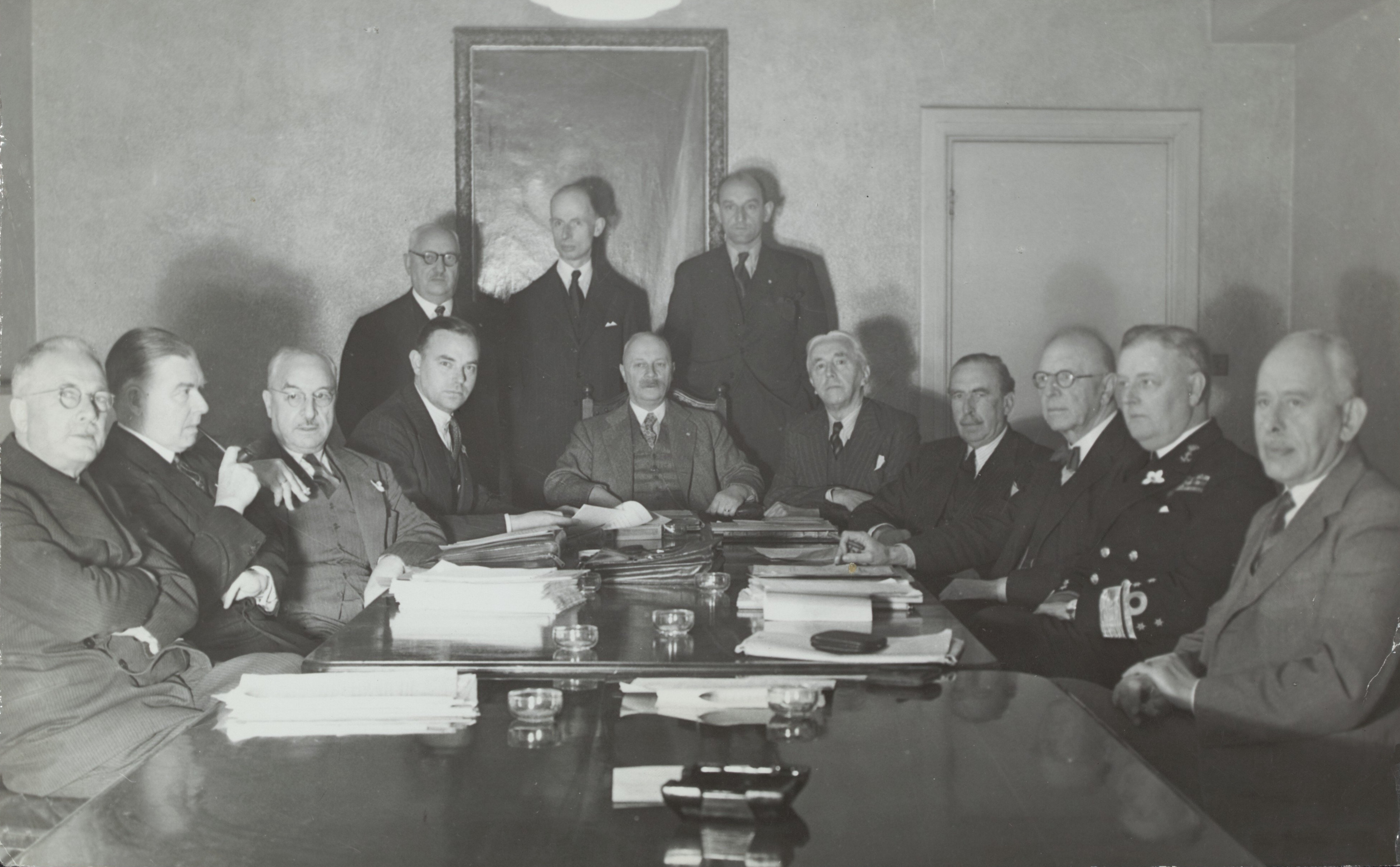
Furstner (seated second from right) in the Second Gerbrandy cabinet in 1944.

World War II began when Germany invaded Poland on 1 September 1939. The Netherlands entered the war when Germany invaded the country on 10 May 1940. During the fighting, Furstner′s tenure as Chief of the Naval Staff came to an end on 14 May 1940, when the Royal Netherlands Army surrendered except for forces fighting in Zeeland, which continued to resist until 17 May 1940. Furstner fled with his staff from Scheveningen to England aboard a fishing boat, although he was indignant about the Dutch cabinet's decision to leave the Netherlands to form a Dutch government-in-exile in London. On 15 May 1940 he took up the newly created position of Commander-in-Chief of Naval Forces. After his arrival in England, he organized the remaining Royal Netherlands Navy fleet and focused on cooperation with the British Royal Navy to defeat Germany.

The Netherlands had abolished its Ministry of the Navy in 1928 and placed government control of the Royal Netherlands Navy in its newly created Ministry of Defence. The Ministry of Defence was abolished on 27 July 1941 and the position of Minister of the Navy was reestablished that day with Furstner as minister in the Second Gerbrandy cabinet. Thereafter, Furstner served simultaneously as Minister of the Navy and Commander-in-Chief of Naval Forces.

Although the pre-war dream of the Netherlands procuring battlecruisers had ended with the German invasion, Furstner and his friend and protégé Vice Admiral Conrad Helfrich, who became Commander-in-Chief of Naval Forces in the East Indies in August 1940, worked to prepare Royal Netherlands Navy forces in the Netherlands East Indies to implement Furstner's version of a "risk theory" strategy in the event of war with Japan. In a series of conferences in Singapore that began in the autumn of 1940, the Dutch met with British, American, and Australian representatives to coordinate their defense of East Asia against Japanese attack. British plans were compatible with Furstner's "risk theory" ideas, and Furstner and Helfrich agreed to place their naval forces in the Far East under British control for combat against Japan. When war came in the Pacific in December 1941, however, fighting in Southeast Asia resulted in a decisive defeat of the Royal Netherlands Navy and the Japanese conquest of the Netherlands East Indies, calling into question the utility of Dutch battlecruisers had they been built. After March 1942 the Royal Netherlands Navy never had the ability to fight as an independent force again during World War II. Furstner turned his attention to leading the important work of replenishing the personnel and equipment of the Royal Netherlands Navy and preparing for the reconstruction of the Dutch naval force after the conclusion of the war.

Furstner was promoted to lieutenant admiral (Dutch: luitenant-admiraal) on 15 February 1942. In his book In ballingschap. De Nederlandse kolonie in Engeland [1940-1945] (English: In Exile: The Dutch Colony in England [1940–1945]), journalist Henri van der Zee paints a negative portrait of Furstner during his time in England. Van der Zee claims that Queen Wilhelmina soon regretted her appointment of him as Minister of the Navy in July 1941. According to van der Zee, Furstner behaved in an arrogant, authoritarian, and tactless manner. He displayed no interest in his subordinates, to Wilhelmina′s displeasure; he never visited his men, unlike British Royal Navy officers, and did not care about Wilhelmina's criticism of him for it. "What caused a lot of bad blood in the navy was Furstner's lack of interest in his people," van der Zee wrote. When Dutch resistance members Peter Tazelaar and Gerard Dogger — who worked with Erik Hazelhoff Roelfzema and Chris Krediet in Contact Holland, an effort directed by Queen Wilhelmina and the British secret service to transport agents from the United Kingdom to the Netherlands and extract people for the return journey — visited Furstner, van der Zee recounts that he was gruff and dismissive of them and, when Tazelaar noted that Contact Holland's operations were by order of Queen Wilhelmina, Furstner responded that "The Queen signs the documents; we rule." Van der Zee also writes that Furstner spent lavishly in England, charging it all to the Royal Netherlands Navy budget; at a time when Dutch Minister of Foreign Affairs Eelco van Kleffens subsisted on a salary of 45 British pounds a month plus an allowance for expenses, Furstner rented a country home near London for 3,000 pounds a year and assigned five servicemen to act as his servants at a cost of 2,500 pounds per year. As early as 1942, he was reprimanded by the Extraordinary Court of Audit, which deemed financial expenditures he and his officers incurred in England "contrary to the necessary austerity and the impoverishment in which the Dutch people found themselves" during the German occupation of the Netherlands.

On 23 February 1945, Furstner resigned his position as Minister of the Navy. He continued to serve as Commander-in-Chief of Naval Forces until August 1945, when the close of hostilities between the Allies and Japan brought World War II to an end. He retired from the navy on 25 August 1945.

=== Post-World War II ===
After World War II, Furstner was a board member of the Nationaal Comité Handhaving Rijkseenheid (English: National Committee for the Maintenance of Unity of the Kingdom), an extra-parliamentary action group in the Netherlands opposed to the independence of Indonesia.

On 25 August 1945, Furstner received a lifetime appointment to the Council of State. During his tenure of more than 17 years, he was a member of the Council of State′s General Affairs, Defense (War), Shipping, Finance, Social Affairs, Navy, Transport, and Foreign Affairs departments. He retired from the Council of State either in 1962 or on 1 January 1963, according to different sources.

== Death ==
Furstner died on 15 September 1970 in The Hague.

== Publications ==
Furstner published articles in the Marineblad and in the organ of the Association for Martial Sciences.

== Honors and awards ==
=== Dutch ===
- Knight of the Order of the Netherlands Lion
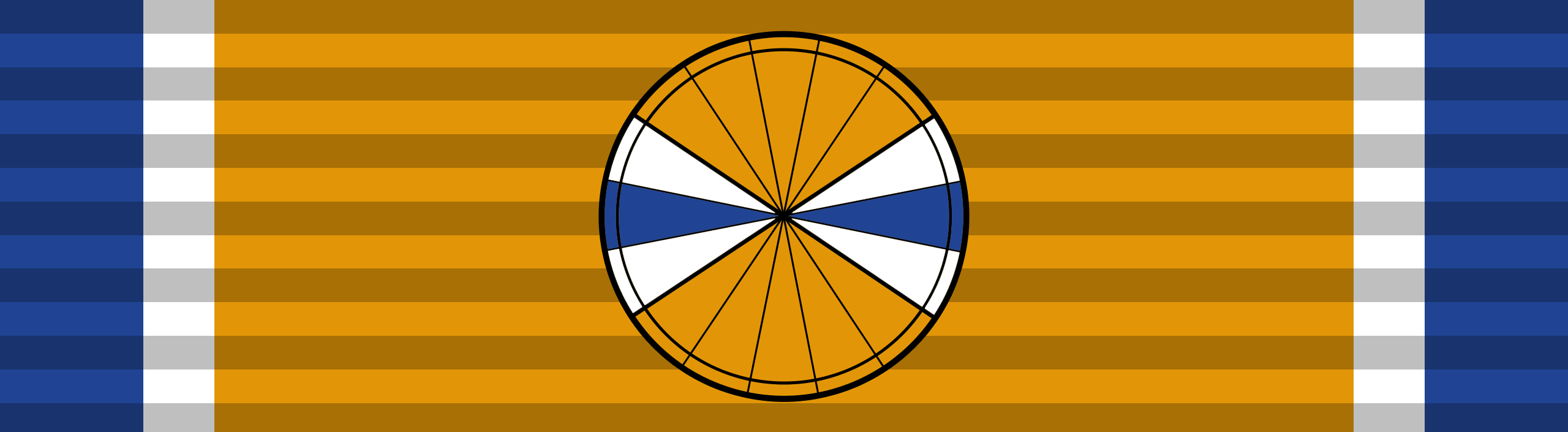
- Officer of the Order of Orange-Nassau
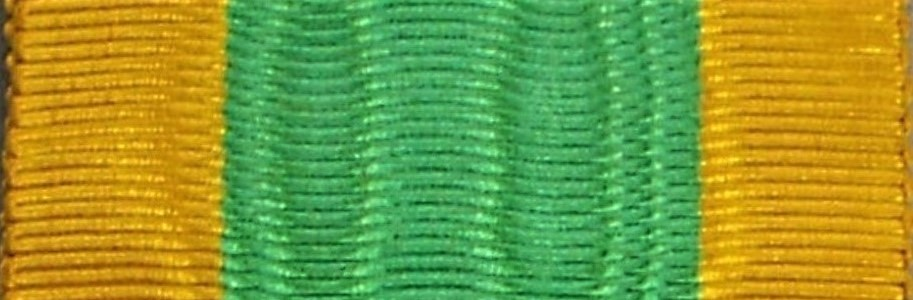
- Expedition Cross (formally, Cross for Important Military Operations) with "Sunda Islands 1905–1909" clasp
- Mobilization Cross 1914-1918
- Officer's Cross for Long Service (30 years)
- Queen Juliana Investiture Medal (1948)

=== Foreign ===
- Honorary Knight Commander of the Order of the Bath (United Kingdom)
- Grand Cross of the Order of the Crown (Belgium)
- Commander of the Order of the Sword (Sweden)
