= Third Gerbrandy cabinet =

Dutch government-in-exile in 1945

Third Gerbrandy cabinet Fourth London cabinet
- Cabinet of the Netherlands
- Date formed: 23 February 1945
- Date dissolved: 25 June 1945 (Demissionary from 12 May 1945)

People and organisations
- Head of state: Queen Wilhelmina
- Head of government: Pieter Sjoerds Gerbrandy
- No. of ministers: 14
- Member party: Roman Catholic State Party (RKSP); Anti-Revolutionary Party (ARP); Free-thinking Democratic League (VDB)
- Status in legislature: National unity government (War cabinet)

History
- Legislature terms: 1937–1945
- Predecessor: Second Gerbrandy cabinet
- Successor: Schermerhorn–Drees cabinet

The Third Gerbrandy cabinet, also called the Fourth London cabinet, was the Dutch government-in-exile from 23 February 1945 until 25 June 1945. The cabinet was formed by the political parties Roman Catholic State Party (RKSP), Anti-Revolutionary Party (ARP) and the Free-thinking Democratic League (VDB) following the resignation of the Second Gerbrandy cabinet on 27 January 1945. The national unity government (war cabinet) was the last of four war cabinets of the government-in-exile in London during World War II.

== Formation ==
On 27 January 1945 the Second Gerbrandy cabinet fell after Minister of the Interior Jaap Burger (SDAP) was asked to resign by Prime Minister Pieter Sjoerds Gerbrandy (ARP) after holding a radio speech, differentiating between "wrongful" Dutch civilians (foute Nederlanders) and Dutch civilians who made a mistake (Nederlanders die een fout hebben gemaakt). However, because Pieter Sjoerds Gerbrandy did not discuss this with the rest of the cabinet, all Social Democratic Workers' Party ministers resigned in response. The demissionary cabinet continued until the installation of the Third Gerbrandy cabinet on 23 February 1945.

== Term ==
Although the cabinet was officially seated in London, Minister of the Interior Louis Beel (RKSP) was already present in the earlier liberated southern part of the Netherlands in Oisterwijk, where he introduced a temporary arrangement for municipal and provincial governments after the war. Emergency municipal councils were to be appointed by a separate electoral colleges. An important part of the administrative tasks in the liberated part of the Netherlands is executed under the authority of the Military Command by the Commander-in-chief of the Armed forces General Prince Bernhard of Lippe-Biesterfeld and Major general Henk Kruls.

== Composition ==
Title	Minister			Term of office	
Title	Image	Name	Party	Start	End
President of the Council of Ministers; Minister of General Warfare of the Kingdom	Pieter Sjoerds Gerbrandy	Pieter Sjoerds Gerbrandy	ARP	23 February 1945	25 June 1945
Minister of Foreign Affairs	Eelco van Kleffens	Eelco van Kleffens	Independent	23 February 1945	25 June 1945
Minister without Portfolio (Foreign Affairs)	Edgar Michiels van Verduynen	Edgar Michiels van Verduynen	Indep. Lib.	23 February 1945	25 June 1945
Minister of Justice	Pieter Sjoerds Gerbrandy	Pieter Sjoerds Gerbrandy (ad interim)	ARP	23 February 1945	25 June 1945
Minister of the Interior	Louis Beel	Louis Beel	RKSP	23 February 1945	25 June 1945
Minister of Education, Arts and Sciences	Gerrit Bolkestein	Gerrit Bolkestein	VDB	23 February 1945	25 June 1945
Minister of Finance	Gerardus Huysmans	Gerardus Huysmans	RKSP	23 February 1945	25 June 1945
Minister of War	Jim de Booy	Jim de Booy (ad interim)	Indep. Lib.	23 February 1945	4 April 1945
Minister of War	Jan de Quay	Jan de Quay	RKSP	4 April 1945	25 June 1945
Minister of the Navy; Minister of Shipping and Fisheries	Jim de Booy	Jim de Booy	Indep. Lib.	23 February 1945	25 June 1945
Minister of Water Management	Frans Wijffels	Frans Wijffels (ad interim)	RKSP	23 February 1945	4 April 1945
Minister of Water Management	Theo Tromp	Theo Tromp	Indep. Lib.	4 April 1945	25 June 1945
Minister of Commerce, Industry and Agriculture	Hans Gispen	Hans Gispen	ARP	23 February 1945	25 June 1945
Minister of Social Affairs	Frans Wijffels	Frans Wijffels	RKSP	23 February 1945	25 June 1945
Minister of Overseas Territories	Josef Schmutzer	Josef Schmutzer	RKSP	23 February 1945	25 June 1945

=== Military authority ===
Military Authority			Term of office	Branch of Service
Bernhard of Lippe-Biesterfeld	General / Lieutenant-Admiral; His Royal Highness; Prince Bernhard of the Netherlands, Prince of Lippe-Biesterfeld (1911–2004)	Commander-in-chief of the Netherlands Armed Forces	3 September 1944 – 13 September 1945	Army; Navy
H.J. (Henk) Kruls	generaal–majoor mr. H.J. (Henk) Kruls (1885–1952)	Military Authority Chief of Staff of the Netherlands Armed Forces	3 September 1944 – 1 January 1946	Army (Artillery)
