= Schermerhorn–Drees cabinet =

Cabinet of the Netherlands, 1945 to 1946

- Cabinet of the Netherlands

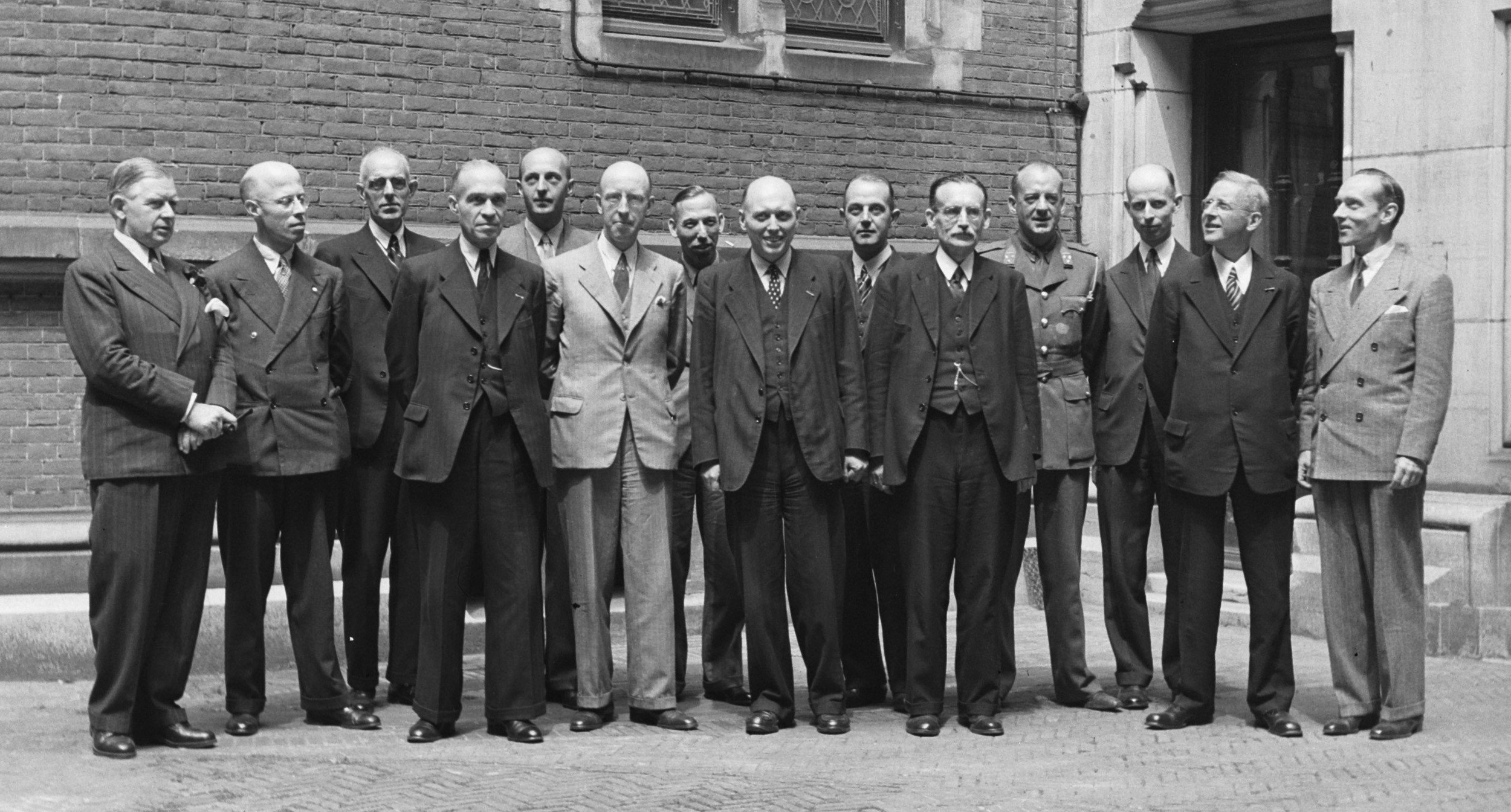
- Presentation of the incoming cabinet at the Binnenhof on 4 June 1945
- Date formed: 25 June 1945
- Date dissolved: 3 July 1946; 1 year, 8 days in office (Demissionary from 16 May 1946)

People and organisations
- Monarch: Queen Wilhelmina
- Prime Minister: Willem Schermerhorn
- Deputy Prime Minister: Willem Drees
- No. of ministers: 16
- Member party: 25 June 1945 – 9 February 1946; Roman Catholic State Party; Social Democratic Workers' Party 9 February 1946 – 3 July 1946; Catholic People's Party; Labour Party
- Status in legislature: Centre-left majority government (Grand coalition/Provisional)

History
- Incoming formation: 1945 formation
- Outgoing formation: 1946 formation
- Legislature terms: Sep–Nov 1945; 1945–1946
- Predecessor: Third Gerbrandy cabinet
- Successor: First Beel cabinet

The Schermerhorn–Drees cabinet was the cabinet of the Netherlands from 25 June 1945 until 3 July 1946. The cabinet was primarily formed by the Roman Catholic State Party (RKSP), the Social Democratic Workers' Party (SDAP) and the Christian Historical Union (CHU) following the end of World War II. The cabinet was a provisional centre-left grand coalition and had a substantial majority in the House of Representatives, with prominent civil engineer Willem Schermerhorn serving as Prime Minister. SDAP leader Willem Drees served as Deputy Prime Minister and Minister of Social Affairs.

This, the first Dutch cabinet after World War II, was appointed by Queen Wilhelmina just a month after the Netherlands was liberated by the Allied forces. It was a royal cabinet (which means that the cabinet is appointed by the monarch, and is not the result of an election). The States General of the Netherlands was not yet functional, and would not become so until November 1945.

The cabinet served during the early days of the post–World War II 1940s. Domestically, it initiated recovery and rebuilding, and implemented several major reforms to social security. Internationally, the formation of the United Nations was started and the beginning of the decolonization of the Dutch East Indies.

== Cabinet actions ==
One of the main tasks of the cabinet was to revive the Dutch economy after the war and to rebuild the devastated infrastructure (ports, railroads, roads). Furthermore the Dutch administration had to be restored. Furthermore the cabinet had to deal with the arrest and prosecution of Dutch war criminals and Dutch collaborators.

Until August 1945 the war against Japan in the Dutch East Indies was also a main objective of the cabinet. After the Japanese surrender the cabinet was faced with the Indonesian nationalists Sukarno and Hatta, who proclaimed the independence of their country.

Another objective of the cabinet was the purification of the black money circuit. During the period the bank accounts in the Netherlands were under investigation by the Ministry of Finance, every Dutch citizen was given 10 guilders by the cabinet, in the Netherlands known as 'Het tientje van Lieftinck' (Lieftinck's tenner), named after the minister of Finance, Dr. Lieftinck.

== Composition ==
Title	Minister			Term of office	
Title	Image	Name	Party	Start	End
Prime Minister; Minister of General Warfare	Willem Schermerhorn	Willem Schermerhorn		25 June 1945	3 July 1946
Prime Minister; Minister of General Warfare	Willem Schermerhorn	Willem Schermerhorn	PvdA	25 June 1945	3 July 1946
Minister of Social Affairs	Willem Drees	Willem Drees	SDAP	25 June 1945	3 July 1946
Minister of Social Affairs	Willem Drees	Willem Drees	PvdA	25 June 1945	3 July 1946
Minister of the Interior	Louis Beel	Louis Beel	RKSP	25 June 1945	3 July 1946
Minister of the Interior	Louis Beel	Louis Beel	KVP	25 June 1945	3 July 1946
Minister of Foreign Affairs	Eelco van Kleffens	Eelco van Kleffens	Indep.	25 June 1945	1 March 1946
Minister of Foreign Affairs	Herman van Roijen	Herman van Roijen	Indep.	1 March 1946	3 July 1946
Minister of Finance	Piet Lieftinck	Piet Lieftinck	CHU	25 June 1945	3 July 1946
Minister of Finance	Piet Lieftinck	Piet Lieftinck	PvdA	25 June 1945	3 July 1946
Minister of Justice	Hans Kolfschoten	Hans Kolfschoten	RKSP	25 June 1945	3 July 1946
Minister of Justice	Hans Kolfschoten	Hans Kolfschoten	KVP	25 June 1945	3 July 1946
Minister of Commerce and Industry	Hein Vos	Hein Vos	SDAP	25 June 1945	3 July 1946
Minister of Commerce and Industry	Hein Vos	Hein Vos	PvdA	25 June 1945	3 July 1946
Minister of War	Jo Meynen	Jo Meynen	ARP	25 June 1945	3 July 1946
Minister of the Navy; Minister of Shipping (ad interim)	Jim de Booy	Jim de Booy	Indep.	25 June 1945	3 July 1946
Minister of Education, Arts and Sciences	Gerard van der Leeuw	Gerard van der Leeuw	Ind. CH	25 June 1945	3 July 1946
Minister of Education, Arts and Sciences	Gerard van der Leeuw	Gerard van der Leeuw	PvdA	25 June 1945	3 July 1946
Minister of Transport and Energy	Steef van Schaik	Steef van Schaik	RKSP	25 June 1945	3 July 1946
Minister of Transport and Energy	Steef van Schaik	Steef van Schaik	KVP	25 June 1945	3 July 1946
Minister of Food Supply, Agriculture and Fisheries (1945); Minister of Agriculture, Fisheries and Food Supply (1945–1946)	Sicco Mansholt	Sicco Mansholt	SDAP	25 June 1945	3 July 1946
Minister of Food Supply, Agriculture and Fisheries (1945); Minister of Agriculture, Fisheries and Food Supply (1945–1946)	Sicco Mansholt	Sicco Mansholt	PvdA	25 June 1945	3 July 1946
Minister of Public Works and Reconstruction	Johan Ringers	Johan Ringers	Indep.	25 June 1945	3 July 1946
Minister of Overseas Territories	Johann Logemann	Johann Logemann	Indep.	25 June 1945	3 July 1946
Minister of Overseas Territories	Johann Logemann	Johann Logemann	PvdA	25 June 1945	3 July 1946
Minister for Foreign Affairs	Herman van Roijen	Herman van Roijen	Indep.	25 June 1945	1 March 1946
Minister for Foreign Affairs	Eelco van Kleffens	Eelco van Kleffens	Indep.	1 March 1946	3 July 1946
