= Second Gerbrandy cabinet =

Dutch government-in-exile, 1941 to 1945

Second Gerbrandy cabinet Third London cabinet
- Cabinet of the Netherlands

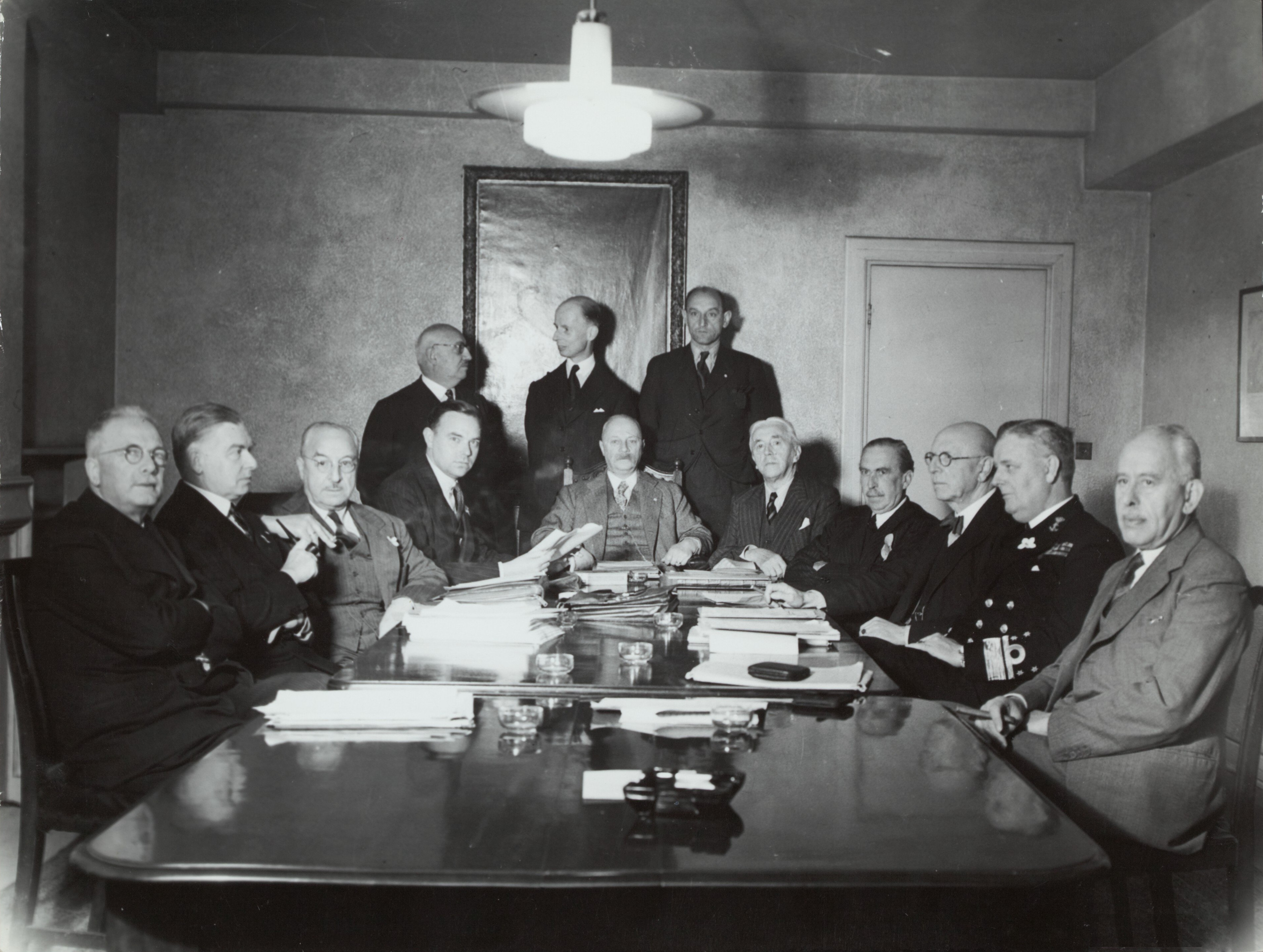
- Meeting of the Second Gerbrandy cabinet in late 1944
- Date formed: 27 July 1941
- Date dissolved: 23 February 1945 (Demissionary from 21 January 1945)

People and organisations
- Head of state: Queen Wilhelmina
- Head of government: Pieter Sjoerds Gerbrandy
- Deputy head of government: Hendrik van Boeijen (De Facto)
- No. of ministers: 17
- Ministers removed: 6
- Total no. of members: 19
- Member party: Roman Catholic State Party (RKSP); Social Democratic Workers' Party (SDAP); Anti-Revolutionary Party (ARP); Christian Historical Union (CHU); Free-thinking Democratic League (VDB); Liberal State Party (LSP)
- Status in legislature: National unity government

History
- Legislature terms: 1937–1945
- Predecessor: First Gerbrandy cabinet
- Successor: Third Gerbrandy cabinet

The Second Gerbrandy cabinet, also called the Third London cabinet was the Dutch government-in-exile from 27 July 1941 until 23 February 1945. The cabinet was formed by the political parties Roman Catholic State Party (RKSP), Social Democratic Workers' Party (SDAP), Anti-Revolutionary Party (ARP), Christian Historical Union (CHU), Free-thinking Democratic League (VDB) and the Liberal State Party (LSP) following the resignation of First Gerbrandy cabinet on 12 June 1941. The national unity government was the third of four war cabinets of the government-in-exile in London during World War II.

== Formation ==
On 12 June 1941 the First Gerbrandy cabinet fell after a conflict between Queen Wilhelmina and Minister of Defence Adriaan Dijxhoorn, leading to the dismissal of the minister. Immediately also the other ministers resigned and the cabinet continued for five weeks as a demissionary cabinet until the ministries were redistributed and the Second Gerbrandy cabinet was installed on 27 July 1941.

== Term ==
The cabinet became the main inspiration for many of the resistance fighters in the Netherlands through radio addresses by Queen Wilhelmina. Important actions of the cabinet include the recognition of the Soviet Union in July 1942, the declaration of war against Japan on 7 December 1942, the announcement that after the war the relations between the Netherlands and the Dutch Indies will change and the re-establishment in July 1943 of the representation at the Vatican. During the first and second cabinet of Gerbrandy plans are made for post-war prosecution of "wrongful" (Dutch: foute) Dutch civilians (collaborators with the Germans).

On 27 January 1945 Minister of the Interior Jaap Burger (SDAP) was asked to resign by Prime Minister Pieter Sjoerds Gerbrandy (ARP) after holding a radio speech, differentiating between "wrongful" Dutch civilians (Dutch: foute Nederlanders) and Dutch civilians who made a mistake (Dutch: Nederlanders die een fout hebben gemaakt). But because Pieter Sjoerds Gerbrandy did not discuss this with rest of the cabinet all Social Democratic Workers' Party ministers resigned in response. The demissionary cabinet continued until the installation of the Third Gerbrandy cabinet on 23 February 1945.

=== Changes ===
On 17 November 1941 Minister of Finance, Minister of Commerce, Industry and Shipping and Minister of Agriculture and Fisheries Max Steenberghe (RKSP) and Minister of Colonial Affairs Charles Welter (RKSP) both resigned after disagreements with the cabinet policy. Minister of Water Management Willem Albarda (SDAP) took over as Minister of Finance and Minister of Social Affairs Jan van den Tempel (SDAP) took over as Minister of Commerce, Industry and Shipping and Minister of Agriculture and Fisheries.

On 31 May 1944 Minister of Commerce, Industry and Shipping and Minister of Agriculture and Fisheries Piet Kerstens (RKSP) was dismissed over a disagreement about the post-war food distribution policy. Both the Ministry of Commerce, Industry and Shipping and the Ministry of Agriculture and Fisheries where subsequently reorganized. Minister of Finance Johannes van den Broek took over as Minister of Commerce, Industry and Agriculture adding the portfolio of Agriculture to the Commerce ministry. Government adviser Jim de Booy was appointed as Minister of Shipping and Fisheries combining the portfolios of Shipping and Fisheries.

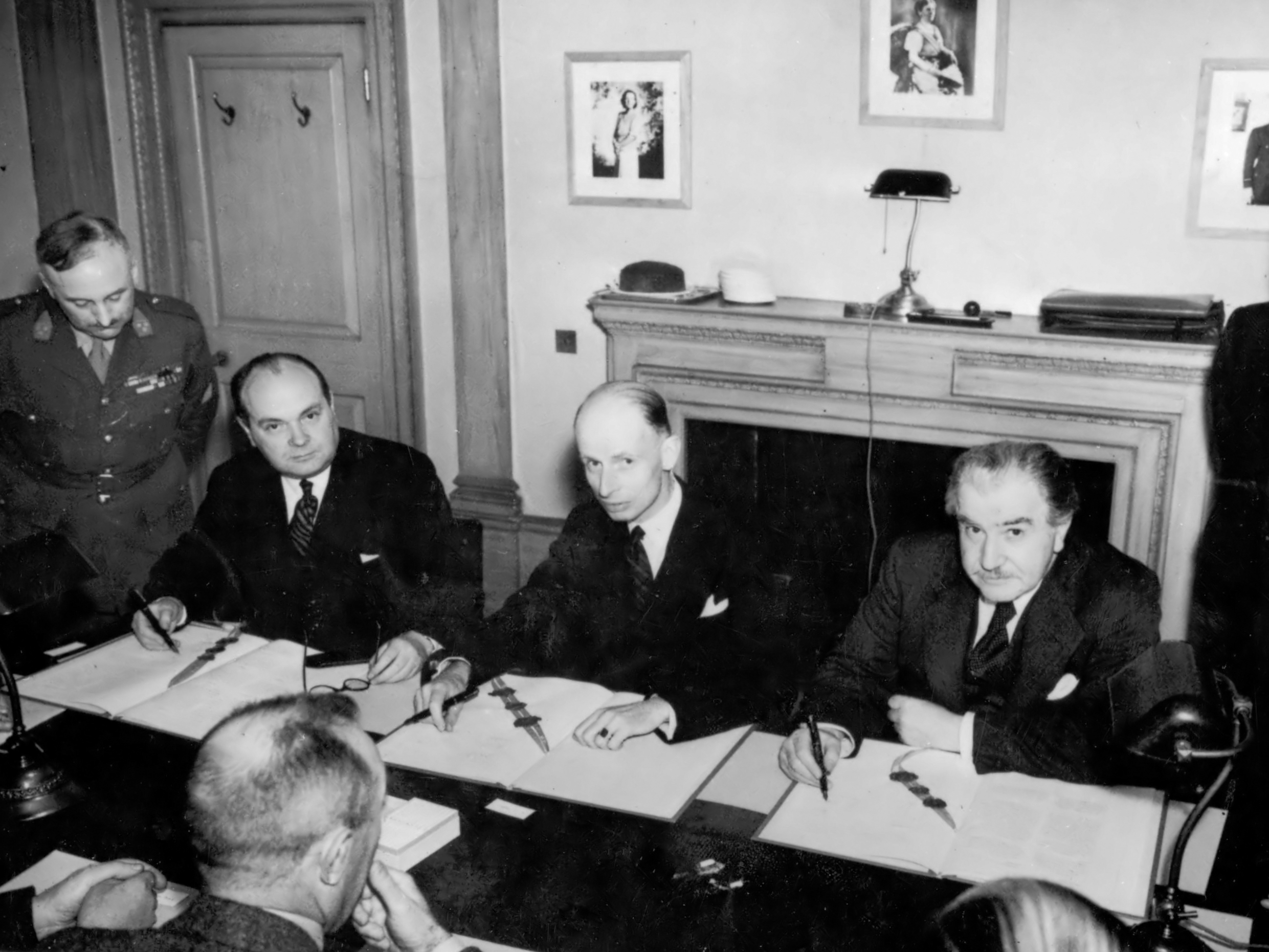
Minister of Foreign Affairs of Belgium Paul-Henri Spaak, Minister of Foreign Affairs Eelco van Kleffens and Minister of Foreign Affairs of Luxembourg Joseph Bech sign a monetary agreement that later became the foundation of the Benelux Union on 21 October 1943 in London.

== Cabinet Members ==
Composition
Ministers		Title/Ministry/Portfolio(s)		Begin	End	Party
Pieter Sjoerds Gerbrandy	Pieter Sjoerds Gerbrandy	Prime Minister		3 September 1940^{[Retained]}	25 June 1945^{[Continued]}	ARP
Pieter Sjoerds Gerbrandy	Pieter Sjoerds Gerbrandy	Minister	General Warfare	21 May 1942^{[Retained]}	25 June 1945^{[Continued]}	ARP
Hendrik van Boeijen	Hendrik van Boeijen	Minister	General Affairs	3 September 1940	23 February 1945^{[Retained]}	CHU
Hendrik van Boeijen	Hendrik van Boeijen	Minister	Interior	24 June 1937^{[Retained]}	31 May 1944	CHU
Jaap Burger	Jaap Burger	Minister	Interior	31 May 1944	27 January 1945^{[Dis]}	SDAP
Hendrik van Boeijen	Hendrik van Boeijen	Minister	Interior	27 January 1945	23 February 1945^{[Ad Interim]}	CHU
Eelco van Kleffens	Eelco van Kleffens	Minister	Foreign Affairs	10 August 1939^{[Retained]}	1 March 1946^{[Continued]}	Independent; Classical Liberal
Max Steenberghe	Max Steenberghe	Minister	Finance	27 July 1941	17 November 1941^{[Res]}	RKSP
Willem Albarda	Willem Albarda	Minister	Finance	17 November 1941	9 December 1942^{[Acting]}	SDAP
Johannes van den Broek	Johannes van den Broek	Minister	Finance	9 December 1942	23 February 1945	Independent; Classical Liberal
Pieter Sjoerds Gerbrandy	Pieter Sjoerds Gerbrandy	Minister	Justice	10 August 1939^{[Retained]}	21 February 1942	ARP
Jan van Angeren	Jan van Angeren	Minister	Justice	21 February 1942	12 July 1944^{[Res]}	Roman Catholic; State Party
Gerrit Jan van Heuven Goedhart	Gerrit Jan van Heuven Goedhart	Minister	Justice	12 July 1944	23 February 1945	Independent; Social Democrat
Max Steenberghe	Max Steenberghe	Minister	Commerce, Industry and Shipping	10 May 1940^{[Retained]}	17 November 1941^{[Res]}	RKSP
Jan van den Tempel	Jan van den Tempel	Minister	Commerce, Industry and Shipping	17 November 1941	8 January 1942^{[Acting]}	SDAP
Piet Kerstens	Piet Kerstens	Minister	Commerce, Industry and Shipping	8 January 1942	31 May 1944^{[Dis]}	RKSP
Johannes van den Broek	Johannes van den Broek	Minister	Commerce, Industry and Agriculture	31 May 1944	23 February 1945	Independent; Classical Liberal
Hendrik van Boeijen	Hendrik van Boeijen	Minister	War	12 June 1941^{[Retained]}	15 September 1942	CHU
Otto van Lidth de Jeude	Otto van Lidth de Jeude	Minister	War	15 September 1942	23 February 1945	LSP
Johan Furstner	Johan Furstner	Minister	Navy	27 July 1941	23 February 1945	Independent; Liberal Conservative
Jan van den Tempel	Jan van den Tempel	Minister	Social Affairs	10 August 1939^{[Retained]}	23 February 1945	SDAP
Gerrit Bolkestein	Gerrit Bolkestein	Minister	Education, Arts and Sciences	10 August 1939^{[Retained]}	25 June 1945^{[Continued]}	VDB
Willem Albarda	Willem Albarda	Minister	Water Management	10 August 1939^{[Retained]}	23 February 1945	SDAP
Max Steenberghe	Max Steenberghe	Minister	Agriculture and Fisheries	1 May 1941^{[Retained]}	17 November 1941^{[Res]}	RKSP
Jan van den Tempel	Jan van den Tempel	Minister	Agriculture and Fisheries	17 November 1941	8 January 1942^{[Acting]}	SDAP
Piet Kerstens	Piet Kerstens	Minister	Agriculture and Fisheries	8 January 1942	31 May 1944^{[Dis]}	RKSP
Jim de Booy	Jim de Booy	Minister	Shipping and Fisheries	31 May 1944	3 July 1946^{[Continued]}	Independent; Classical Liberal
Charles Welter	Charles Welter	Minister	Colonial Affairs	10 August 1939^{[Retained]}	17 November 1941^{[Res]}	RKSP
Pieter Sjoerds Gerbrandy	Pieter Sjoerds; Gerbrandy	Minister	Colonial Affairs	17 November 1941	21 May 1942^{[Acting]}	ARP
Huib van Mook	Huib van Mook	Minister	Colonial Affairs	21 May 1942	23 February 1945	Independent; Social Liberal

Composition
Ministers		Title/Ministry/Portfolio(s)			Term of office	Party
Jaap Burger	Jaap Burger (1904–1986)	Minister	Interior	• Provisional; Governmental; Affairs	11 August 1943 – 31 May 1944^{[App]}	Social Democratic; Workers' Party
Edgar Michiels van Verduynen	Jonkheer; Edgar Michiels van Verduynen (1885–1952)	Minister	Foreign Affairs	• Foreign Policy	1 January 1942 – 25 June 1945^{[Continued]}	Independent; Classical Liberal
Adipati Soejono	Pangeran Adipati; Soejono (1886–1943)	Minister	Colonial Affairs	• Dutch East; Indies	9 June 1942 – 5 January 1943^{[Died]}	Independent; Liberal Conservative

^{Resigned}
^{Dismissed from office}
^{Retained from the previous cabinet}
^{Continued in the next cabinet}
^{Acting}
^{Ad Interim}
^{Died in Office}
^{Appointed as Minister of the Interior}

Rang/Title/Position		Military Command		Begin	End
Bernhard of Lippe-Biesterfeld	Prince Bernhard of Lippe-Biesterfeld	Commander-in-chief	Armed Forces	3 September 1944	13 September 1945
