= Minister of War (disambiguation) =

A Minister of War is a defence minister.

Minister of War can also refer to:

- Minister of War (Austria-Hungary)
- Minister of War (Denmark)
- Minister of War (France)
- Minister of War of Hungary
- Italian Minister of War
- Army Ministry (Japan)
- Minister of War (Netherlands)
- Minister of War (Prussia)
- Minister of War (Spain)

== See also ==
- Ministry of War (disambiguation)
