= Minister of War (Netherlands) =

- Minister van Oorlog
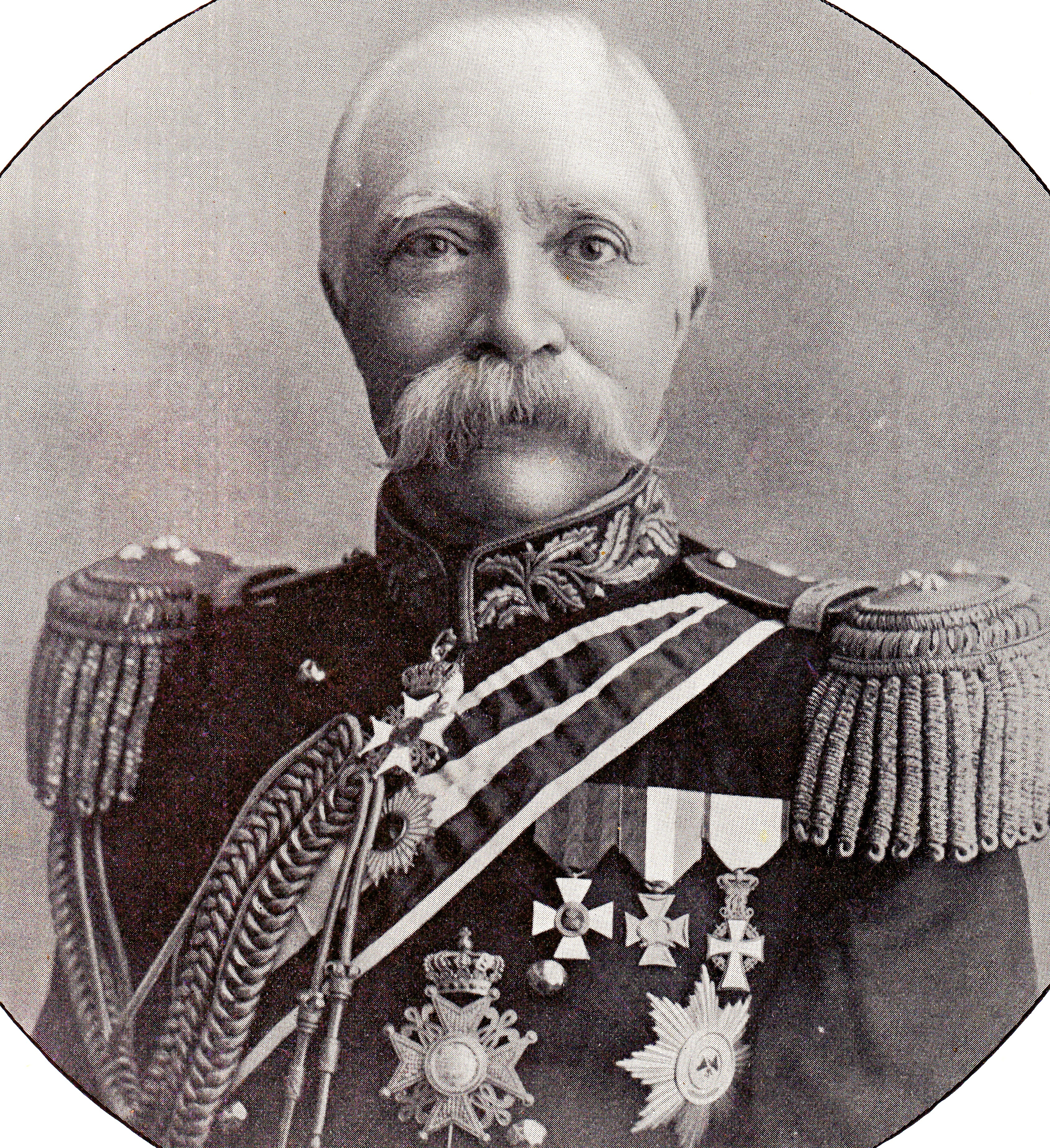
- Longest serving Johannes Willem Bergansius; 21 April 1888–21 August 1891; 1 August 1901–17 August 1905
- Ministry of War
- Member of: Council of Ministers; Cabinet
- Appointer: The Monarch
- Formation: 25 March 1848
- First holder: Charles Nepveu
- Final holder: Alexander Fiévez
- Abolished: 7 August 1948
- Superseded by: Minister of Defence
- Deputy: State Secretary for War

The minister of war of the Netherlands (Dutch: Minister van Oorlog), was the minister responsible for the Ministry of War and the Royal Netherlands Army. The position was abolished with the creation of the position for Minister of Defence.

The first minister of war was Charles Nepveu, while the last one was Alexander Fiévez, a member of the Catholic People's Party.

== List of officeholders ==
No.	Portrait	Name (Born-Died)	Term of office			Political Party	Cabinet	Ref.
No.	Portrait	Name (Born-Died)	Took office	Left office	Time in office	Political Party	Cabinet	Ref.
1		Charles Nepveu (1791–1871)	25 March 1848	21 November 1848	241 days	Independent	Schimmelpenninck	
2		Jan Hendrik Voet (1793–1852)	21 November 1848	1 November 1849	345 days	Independent	De Kempenaer-Donker Curtius	
3		Johannes Theodorus van Spengler (1790–1856)	1 November 1849	15 July 1852	2 years, 257 days	Independent	Thorbecke I	
4		Lieutenant general Hendrik Forstner van Dambenoy (1792–1870)	15 July 1852	31 December 1857	5 years, 169 days	Independent; Conservative	Thorbecke I Van Hall-Donker Curtius Van der Brugghen	
5		Cornelis Theodorus van Meurs (1799–1894)	31 December 1857	1 September 1859	1 year, 244 days	Independent	Van der Brugghen Rochussen	
6		Lieutenant general Eduard de Casembroot (1812–1883)	1 September 1859	1 February 1862	2 years, 153 days	Independent; Conservative	Rochussen Van Hall-Van Heemstra Van Zuylen van Nijevelt-Van Heemstra	
7		Lieutenant general Johan Wilhelm Blanken (1806–1880)	1 February 1862	1 June 1866	4 years, 120 days	Independent; Liberal	Thorbecke II Fransen van de Putte	
8		Major general Johan van den Bosch (1813–1870)	1 June 1866	4 June 1868	2 years, 3 days	Independent; Conservative (Liberal Conservative)	Van Zuylen van Nijevelt	
9	Joannes Josephus van Mulken	Lieutenant general Joannes Josephus van Mulken (1796–1879)	4 June 1868	4 January 1871	2 years, 214 days	Independent; Liberal (Classical Liberal)	Van Bosse–Fock	
10	Gerardus Petrus Booms	Colonel; Gerardus Petrus Booms (1822–1897)	4 January 1871	28 January 1871 (resigned)	24 days	Independent; Liberal (Classical Liberal)	Thorbecke III	
11	Adriaan Engelvaart	Major general Adriaan Engelvaart (1812–1893)	28 January 1871	23 December 1871 (resigned)	329 days	Independent; Liberal (Classical Liberal)	Thorbecke III	
–		Lodewijk Gerard Brocx (1819–1880); Acting	23 December 1871	5 February 1872	44 days	Independent; Liberal (Classical Liberal)	Thorbecke III	
12		Major general Félix Delprat (1812–1888)	5 February 1872	6 July 1872	152 days	Independent; Liberal (Classical Liberal)	Thorbecke III	
13	Menno David van Limburg Stirum	Major general Count Menno David van Limburg Stirum (1807–1891)	6 July 1872	15 September 1873 (resigned)	1 year, 71 days	Independent; Liberal (Classical Liberal)	De Vries–Fransen van de Putte	
–		Lodewijk Gerard Brocx (1819–1880); Acting	15 September 1873	6 October 1873	21 days	Independent; Liberal (Classical Liberal)	De Vries–Fransen van de Putte	
14	August Willem Philip Weitzel	Major general August Willem; Philip Weitzel (1816–1896)	6 October 1873	29 April 1875 (resigned)	1 year, 205 days	Independent; Liberal (Conservative Liberal)	De Vries–Fransen van de Putte	
14	August Willem Philip Weitzel	Major general August Willem; Philip Weitzel (1816–1896)	6 October 1873	29 April 1875 (resigned)	1 year, 205 days	Independent; Liberal (Conservative Liberal)	Heemskerk–Van Lynden van Sandenburg	
15	Hendrik Enderlein	Colonel; Hendrik Enderlein (1821–1898)	29 April 1875	1 January 1876 (resigned)	247 days	Independent; Conservative (Liberal Conservative)	Heemskerk–Van Lynden van Sandenburg	
–	Willem van Erp Taalman Kip	Willem van Erp Taalman Kip (1824–1905); Acting	1 January 1876	1 February 1876	31 days	Independent; Liberal (Conservative Liberal)	Heemskerk–Van Lynden van Sandenburg	
16		Jonkheer Guillaume Klerck (1825–1884)	1 February 1876	11 September 1876 (resigned)	223 days	Independent; Liberal (Conservative Liberal)	Heemskerk–Van Lynden van Sandenburg	
–	Willem van Erp Taalman Kip	Willem van Erp Taalman Kip (1824–1905); Acting	11 September 1876	30 September 1876	19 days	Independent; Liberal (Conservative Liberal)	Heemskerk–Van Lynden van Sandenburg	
17		Colonel; Hendrik Beijen (1817–1892)	30 September 1876	3 November 1877	1 year, 34 days	Independent; Conservative (Liberal Conservative)	Heemskerk–Van Lynden van Sandenburg	
18	Jan Karel de Roo van Alderwerelt	Major; Jan Karel de Roo van Alderwerelt (1832–1878)	3 November 1877	29 December 1878 †	1 year, 56 days	Independent; Liberal (Classical Liberal)	Kappeyne van de Coppello	
–	Hendrikus Wichers	Captain; Jonkheer Hendrikus Wichers (1831–1889); Acting	29 December 1878	15 February 1879	48 days	Independent; Liberal (Classical Liberal)	Kappeyne van de Coppello	
19	Jacobus den Beer Poortugael	Major general Jacobus den Beer Poortugael (1832–1913)	15 February 1879	20 August 1879	186 days	Independent; Liberal (Classical Liberal)	Kappeyne van de Coppello	
20	Anthonie Reuther	Major general Anthonie Reuther (1819–1889)	20 August 1879	23 April 1883	3 years, 246 days	Independent; Christian Democrat (Conservative Catholic)	Van Lynden van Sandenburg	
(14)	August Willem Philip Weitzel	Major general August Willem; Philip Weitzel (1816–1896)	23 April 1883	21 April 1888	4 years, 364 days	Independent; Liberal (Conservative Liberal)	J. Heemskerk	
21	Johannes Bergansius	Major general Johannes Bergansius (1836–1913)	21 April 1888	21 August 1891	3 years, 122 days	Independent; Christian Democrat (Catholic)	Mackay	
22	Lodewijk Seyffardt	Colonel; Lodewijk Seyffardt (1840–1909)	21 August 1891	9 May 1894	2 years, 261 days	Independent; Liberal (Social Liberal)	Van Tienhoven	
23	Clemens Schneider	Lieutenant general Clemens Schneider (1832–1925)	9 May 1894	27 July 1897	3 years, 79 days	Independent; Christian Democrat (Catholic)	Röell	
–	Joannes Coenraad Jansen	Joannes Coenraad; Jansen (1840–1925); Acting	27 July 1897	31 July 1897	4 days	Liberal Union	Pierson	
24	Kornelis Eland	Lieutenant general Kornelis Eland (1838–1927)	31 July 1897	1 April 1901 (resigned)	3 years, 244 days	Liberal Union	Pierson	
25	Arthur Kool	Lieutenant general Arthur Kool (1841–1914)	1 April 1901	1 August 1901	122 days	Liberal Union	Pierson	
(21)	Johannes Bergansius	Lieutenant general Johannes Bergansius (1836–1913)	1 August 1901	17 August 1905	4 years, 16 days	Independent; Christian Democrat (Catholic)	Kuyper	
	Johannes Bergansius	Lieutenant general Johannes Bergansius (1836–1913)	1 August 1901	17 August 1905	4 years, 16 days	General League of Roman Catholic; Caucuses	Kuyper	
26	Henri Staal	Major general Henri Staal (1845–1920)	17 August 1905	7 April 1907 (resigned)	1 year, 233 days	Liberal Union	De Meester	
27	Willem van Rappard	Major general Ridder Willem van Rappard (1846–1913)	7 April 1907	12 February 1908	311 days	Independent; Liberal (Classical Liberal)	De Meester	
28	Frederik Sabron	Lieutenant general Frederik Sabron (1849–1916)	12 February 1908	27 July 1909 (resigned)	1 year, 165 days	Independent	T. Heemskerk	
29	Wouter Cool	Major general Wouter Cool (1848–1928)	27 July 1909	4 January 1911 (resigned)	1 year, 161 days	Independent; Liberal (Conservative Liberal)	T. Heemskerk	
30	Hendrikus Colijn	Major; Hendrikus Colijn (1869–1944)	4 January 1911	29 August 1913	2 years, 237 days	Anti-Revolutionary Party	T. Heemskerk	
31	Nicolaas Bosboom	Major general Nicolaas Bosboom (1855–1937)	29 August 1913	15 May 1917 (resigned)	3 years, 259 days	Independent; Liberal (Conservative Liberal)	Cort van der Linden	
–	Jean Jacques Rambonnet	Rear admiral Jean Jacques; Rambonnet (1864–1943); Acting	15 May 1917	15 June 1917	31 days	Independent; Liberal (Classical Liberal)	Cort van der Linden	
32	Bonifacius Cornelis de Jonge	Jonkheer Bonifacius Cornelis de Jonge (1875–1958)	15 June 1917	9 September 1918	1 year, 86 days	Christian Historical Union	Cort van der Linden	
33	George Alting von Geusau	Jonkheer George Alting von Geusau (1864–1937)	9 September 1918	5 January 1920 (resigned)	1 year, 118 days	Roman Catholic; State Party	Ruijs de Beerenbrouck I	
–	Charles Ruijs de Beerenbrouck	Jonkheer Charles Ruijs de Beerenbrouck (1873–1936); Acting	5 January 1920	31 March 1920	86 days	Roman Catholic; State Party	Ruijs de Beerenbrouck I	
34	Willem Frederik Pop	Lieutenant general Willem Frederik Pop (1858–1931)	31 March 1920	28 July 1921 (resigned)	1 year, 119 days	Independent	Ruijs de Beerenbrouck I	
35	Jannes van Dijk	Captain; Jannes van Dijk (1871–1954)	28 July 1921	4 August 1925	4 years, 7 days	Anti-Revolutionary Party	Ruijs de Beerenbrouck I	
35	Jannes van Dijk	Captain; Jannes van Dijk (1871–1954)	28 July 1921	4 August 1925	4 years, 7 days	Anti-Revolutionary Party	Ruijs de Beerenbrouck II	
36	Johan Lambooij	Major; Johan Lambooij (1874–1942)	4 August 1925	8 March 1926	216 days	Roman Catholic; State Party	Colijn I	
37	Louis van Royen	Captain; Louis van Royen (1865–1946)	8 March 1926	24 April 1926 (resigned)	47 days	Independent; Liberal (Classical Liberal)	De Geer I	
(36)	Johan Lambooij	Major; Johan Lambooij (1874–1942)	24 April 1926	1 September 1928	2 years, 130 days	Roman Catholic; State Party	De Geer I	
No minister of War, Minister of Defence (1928–1941)
38	Hendrik van Boeijen	Hendrik van Boeijen (1889–1947)	27 July 1941	15 September 1942	1 year, 50 days	Christian Historical Union	Gerbrandy II	
39	Otto van Lidth de Jeude	Jonkheer Otto van Lidth de Jeude (1881–1952)	15 September 1942	23 February 1945	2 years, 161 days	Liberal State Party	Gerbrandy II	
–	Jim de Booy	Lieutenant commander Jim de Booy (1885–1969); Acting	23 February 1945	4 April 1945	40 days	Independent; Liberal (Classical Liberal)	Gerbrandy III	
40	Jan de Quay	Major; Dr. Jan de Quay (1901–1985)	4 April 1945	25 June 1945	82 days	Roman Catholic; State Party	Gerbrandy III	
41	Jo Meynen	Jo Meynen (1901–1980)	25 June 1945	3 July 1946	1 year, 8 days	Anti-Revolutionary Party	Schermerhorn–Drees	
42	Alexander Fiévez	Lieutenant colonel Alexander Fiévez (1902–1949)	3 July 1946	7 August 1948	2 years, 35 days	Catholic People's Party	Beel I	

== See also ==
- List of ministers of defence of the Netherlands
- Minister of the Navy
