= Alexander Fiévez =

Dutch politician (1902–1949)

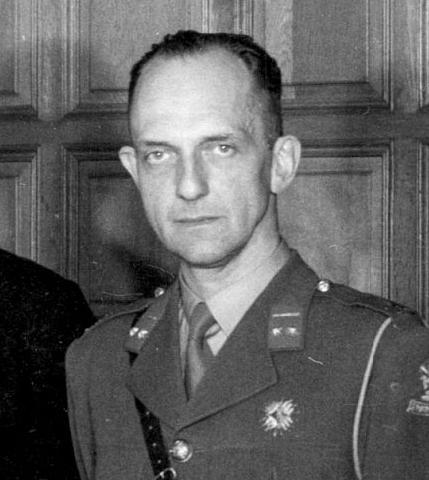
- Fiévez in 1946

Minister of the Navy Acting
- In office 25 November 1947 – 7 August 1948
- Prime Minister: Louis Beel
- Preceded by: Jules Schagen van Leeuwen
- Succeeded by: Wim Schokking
- In office 3 July 1946 – 7 August 1946
- Prime Minister: Louis Beel
- Preceded by: Jim de Booy
- Succeeded by: Jules Schagen van Leeuwen

Minister of War
- In office 3 July 1946 – 7 August 1948
- Prime Minister: Louis Beel
- Preceded by: Jo Meynen
- Succeeded by: Wim Schokking

Member of the House of Representatives
- In office 27 July 1948 – 30 April 1949
- Parliamentary group: Christian Historical Union

Personal details
- Born: Alexander Helenus Johannes Leopoldus Fiévez; 22 June 1902 Zutphen, Netherlands
- Died: 30 April 1949 (aged 46) The Hague, Netherlands
- Cause of death: Lung cancer
- Party: Catholic People's Party (from 1945)
- Other political affiliations: Roman Catholic State Party (until 1945)
- Spouse: Cornelia Gerardina Helena Stokvis (m. 1928)
- Children: 4 sons and 1 daughter
- Education: Royal Military Academy
- Occupation: Politician; Military officer; Teacher

Military service
- Allegiance: Netherlands
- Branch/service: Royal Netherlands Army
- Years of service: 1919–1946 (Active duty); 1946–1948 (Reserve)
- Rank: Colonel
- Unit: Infantry
- Battles/wars: World War II; Battle of the Netherlands; Battle of the Grebbeberg

Alexander Helenus Johannes Leopoldus Fiévez (22 June 1902 – 30 April 1949) was a Dutch politician and military officer.
