= Order of the Netherlands Lion =

Dutch order of chivalry

Order of the Netherlands Lion Orde van de Nederlandse Leeuw
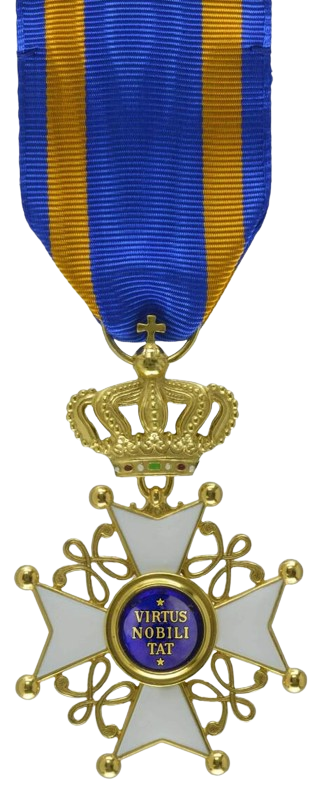
- The decoration of a Knight of the Order of the Netherlands Lion

Awarded by The King of the Netherlands
- Type: Chivalric order with three degrees
- Established: 29 September 1815
- Motto: Virtus Nobilitat
- Awarded for: Those with merits of a very exceptional nature for society
- Status: Currently constituted
- Grand Master: King Willem-Alexander
- Chancellor: Major general H. Morsink
- Grades: Knight/Grand Cross; Knight Commander; Knight
- Former grades: Brother

Precedence
- Next (higher): Honorary Medal for Charitable Assistance in Gold
- Next (lower): Order of Orange-Nassau
- Ribbon bar of the Order of the Netherlands Lion

The Order of the Netherlands Lion, also known as the Order of the Lion of the Netherlands (Dutch: De Orde van de Nederlandse Leeuw, French: L'Ordre du Lion Néerlandais) is a Dutch order of chivalry founded by William I of the Netherlands on 29 September 1815.

The Order of the Netherlands Lion was until recently awarded to eminent individuals from all walks of life, including generals, ministers of the crown, mayors of large towns, professors and leading scientists, industrialists, high-ranking civil servants, presiding judges and renowned artists. Since 1980 the Order has been primarily used to recognise merit in the arts, science, sport and literature; others are awarded the Order of Orange-Nassau. Appointment to the grade of Commander (see below) is very rare (Nobel Prizewinners; the conductor Bernard Haitink towards the end of his life, and the dancer and choreographer Hans van Manen, for example). The Order ranks after the Military William Order, which is only awarded for military merit. The second and third class of the Order are not awarded to foreigners; they are eligible for the Order of Orange-Nassau or the Order of the Crown instead.

The King (or Queen) of the Netherlands is the Grand Master of the Order. The Order is issued in three classes. There was also a Medal for "Brothers" which has not been conferred since 1960. The Brothers became extinct and the grade was abolished in 1994.

== Grades ==
The following classes and grades exist for the Order:

1. Knight Grand Cross – Reserved for members of the Royal Family, foreign Heads of State and a select group of former prime ministers, ministers, princes and cardinals.
2. Commander – Usually conferred upon Dutch Nobel Prize winners, a few distinguished artists, writers and politicians.
3. Knight
4. Brother – No longer issued; see section below.

== Insignia ==
Grade	Knight Grand Cross	Commander	Knight	Brother
Insignia				
Ribbon bar				

The badge of the Order is a gilt, white-enamelled Maltese Cross, with the monogram "W" (for King William I) between the arms of the cross. The obverse central disc is in blue enamel, bearing the motto Virtus Nobilitat (Virtue Ennobles). The reverse central disc is plain golden, with the lion from the Netherlands coat-of-arms. The badge hangs from a royal crown. As with all honours awarded by the Netherlands, the insignia comprises a decoration, a miniature and optionally a breast star. The decoration and breast stars are only worn at formal occasions or while in state office. While wearing a dinnerjacket, one is nowadays allowed to wear the miniature but habits and fashions are changing. Decorations are not worn on any other type of clothing.

=== Knight Grand Cross ===
The decoration hangs from a ribbon. This is tied as a sash, which is worn from the right shoulder to the left hip.

The star, consisting of the decoration without crown, is attached to an eight-pointed slightly rounded golden star consisting of forty-eight rays. The rays of the star are alternately scaled and all tied at the ends. The star is worn directly above the waist on the left-hand side of the clothing. The star and the medal described above are always worn together.

The miniature is a ribbon tied as a rosette, behind which a bar of gold braid is attached. This is all attached to a bow. The miniature is worn in the place of the decorations described above.

=== Commander ===
The decoration hangs from a ribbon. This ribbon is smaller in diameter than the ribbon of a Grand Cross.

The star consists of a slightly larger decoration, which is worn directly above the middle on the left-hand side of the clothing. The star and the decoration described above are always worn together.

The miniature only differs from that of the Grand Cross by the bar of silver braid instead of gold braid.

=== Knight ===
The decoration hangs from the ribbon that is worn at chest height on the left-hand side of the clothing. The ribbon for women is tied in the shape of a bow.

The miniature is tied in the shape of a bow.

== Brothers ==
Associated with the Order of the Netherlands Lion was the grade known as the Brother, originally intended as an award to those of a lower social class, who performed useful acts, self-sacrifice or other acts of kindness towards fellow human beings. The award came with an annual payment of 200 guilders, of which half would be paid to the widow(er) at the death of the award holder. The first female Brother, midwife Johanna Goozen, was admitted in 1921.

During the reign of Queen Juliana, Brothers became an award for lifeboat crews, until the last award was made in 1960. The grade of Brother was abolished in 1994; by then there was no living Brother nor surviving widow(er).

The badge of honour for Brothers was a silver medal, with the lion from the Netherlands coat of arms on the obverse, and the motto Virtus Nobilitat (English: Virtue Ennobles) on the reverse.

The ribbon for Brothers was blue with a single orange central stripe.

== See also ==
- Dutch Cross of Resistance
- Recipients of the Order of the Netherlands Lion
