= Soejono =

Soejono is a surname. Notable people with the surname include:

- Adipati Soejono (1886–1943), Dutch politician
- Raden Panji Soejono (1926–2011), Indonesian archaeologist
- Widjojo Soejono (1928–2022), Indonesian military officer
