= Johan van den Broek =

Dutch politician (1882–1946)

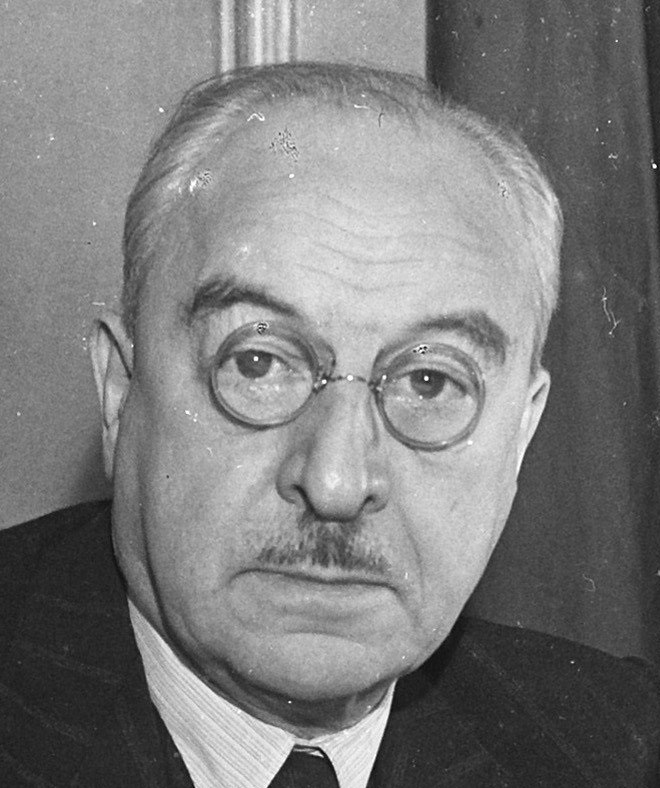
Johannes van den Broek in 1944

Johannes van den Broek (26 October 1882, Haarlem – 22 October 1946, The Hague) was a businessman and Dutch minister of finance from 1942 to 1945. He was chairman of the Biliton Company in the Dutch East Indies from 1931, and in 1942 he was appointed minister of finance of the Dutch government-in-exile in London. In 1944-45 he also was minister of economic affairs.
