= Christian democracy in the Netherlands =

This article gives an overview of Christian democracy in the Netherlands, which is also called confessionalism, including political Catholicism and Protestantism.

== History ==
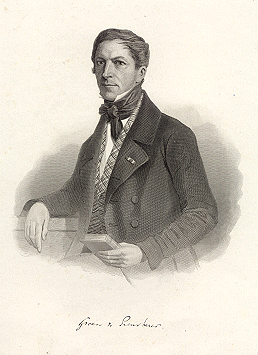
Guillaume Groen van Prinsterer was one of the first in the Netherlands to formulate Christian democratic principles.

Christian democracy is the second oldest political ideology in the Netherlands, although before 1977 it was called "confessionalism" (politics based on the Christian confession).

Christian democracy in the Netherlands is separated by roughly two kinds of cleavages—religious cleavages and political cleavages—which sometimes coincide.

The strongest religious cleavage is between Catholicism and Protestantism. Before the 1920s Catholics were treated as second class citizens and they were strongly despised by Protestants, who combined their Dutch nationalism with fierce anti-papism. There also are strong cleavages within Protestantism, most notably between the Dutch Reformed Church (Hervormd) and the Reformed Churches in the Netherlands (Gereformeerd). There are also cleavages within the Reformed Churches. The religious cleavages were reinforced by pillarisation—self-imposed religious segregation.

Christian democratic parties were also divided on political matters. The left-right cleavage split left-wing, centrist and right-wing strands of Christian democracy within the movement.

Before the 1880s the dominant political division in the Netherlands was between liberalism and conservatism. Orthodox strands of Protestantism were allied with the conservatives, while political Catholicism was allied with liberalism.

=== Origins and party formation ===
One of the issues that led to the rise of Christian democracy in the Netherlands was the school struggle. Since the French period, public education in the Netherlands had been secular. After failed attempts to restore the Christian nature of public education, several Christian politicians such as Guillaume Groen van Prinsterer started promoting the establishment of private Christian schools. An 1878 act of parliament put higher demands on the quality of school buildings and the wages and education of teachers. These higher demands were accompanied by additional funding from the government for secular public schools, but not for Christian schools, many of which were unable to sustain the financial burden. This intensified the Christians' call for equal funding for Christian schools.

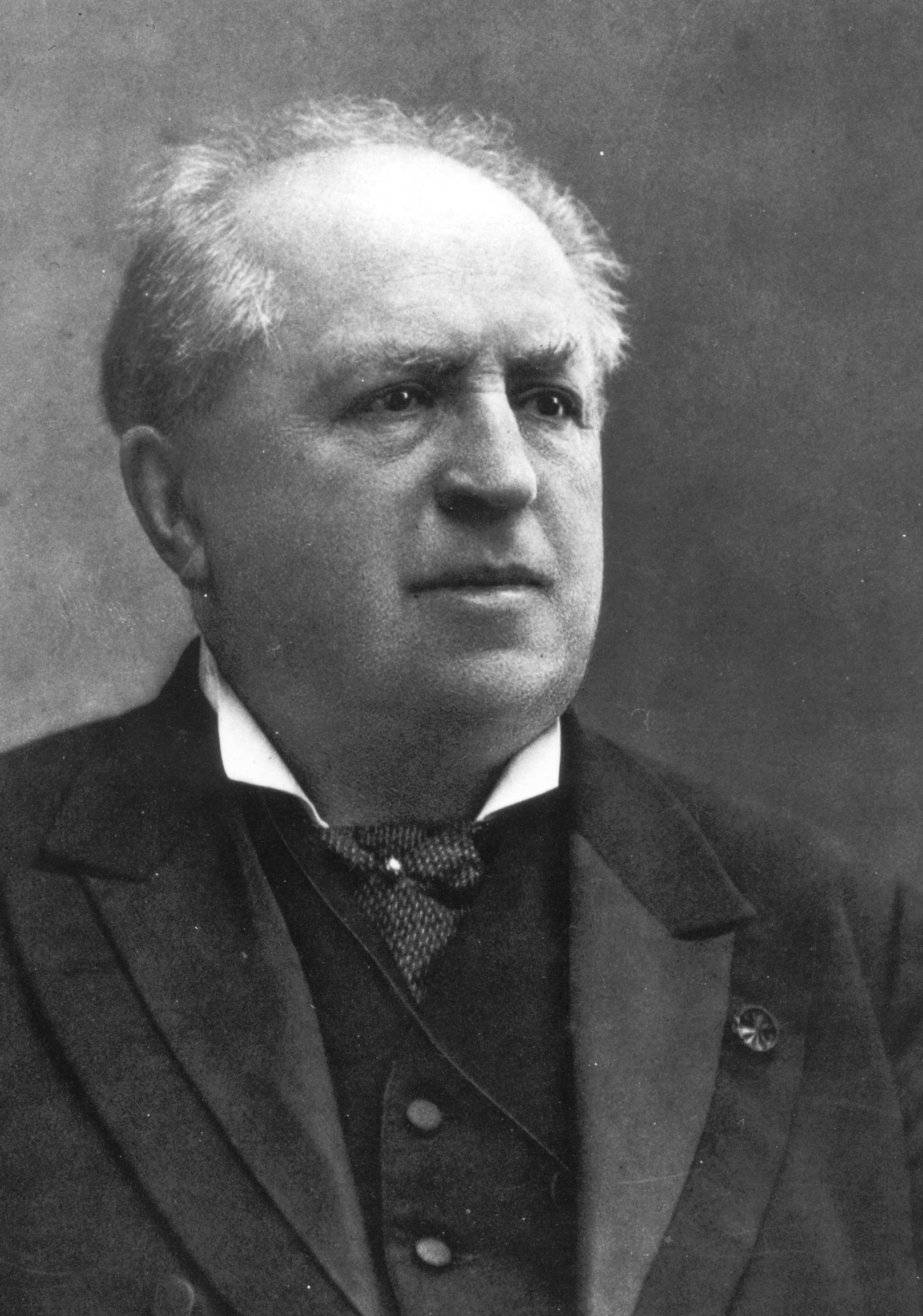
Abraham Kuyper founded the Anti-Revolutionary Party in 1879.

On 3 April 1879, the theologian Abraham Kuyper founded the Anti-Revolutionary Party (ARP), the first national political party in the Netherlands. It was accompanied by the formation of a separate orthodox Protestant pillar, social group, which involved a separate church, the Reformed Churches in the Netherlands and a separate system of Protestant schools, including the Free University. This separate organisation was based on a particular interpretation of the separation between church and state, namely sphere sovereignty. It also advocated the extension of suffrage to all fathers of households.

Kuyper, who had taken over leadership of the school struggle after Groen van Prinsterer's death in 1876, advocated cooperation with the Catholics in order to form united opposition to the liberals, a concept known as the antithesis. The Catholics lacked a political organisation, but were informally led by Herman Schaepman, who had been the first priest elected to the States General of the Netherlands. They had a solid electoral base in the predominantly Catholic south and an organisation in the Catholic Church. They lacked a shared political position, but tended to favour the extension of suffrage and equal finance for Catholic schools. The Catholics had allied with the liberals in previous decades, but the school struggle, as well as the Quanta cura and the Syllabus of Errors of 1864, led Schaepman to move closer the Protestants instead.

In the 1880s the ARP's strategy became successful, both electorally, as it became an important political actor, and politically, as it was able to form an alliance, the Coalition, with the Catholics. After the 1888 cabinet formation this resulted in the first cabinet comprising both Protestant and Catholic ministers, led by Æneas Mackay.

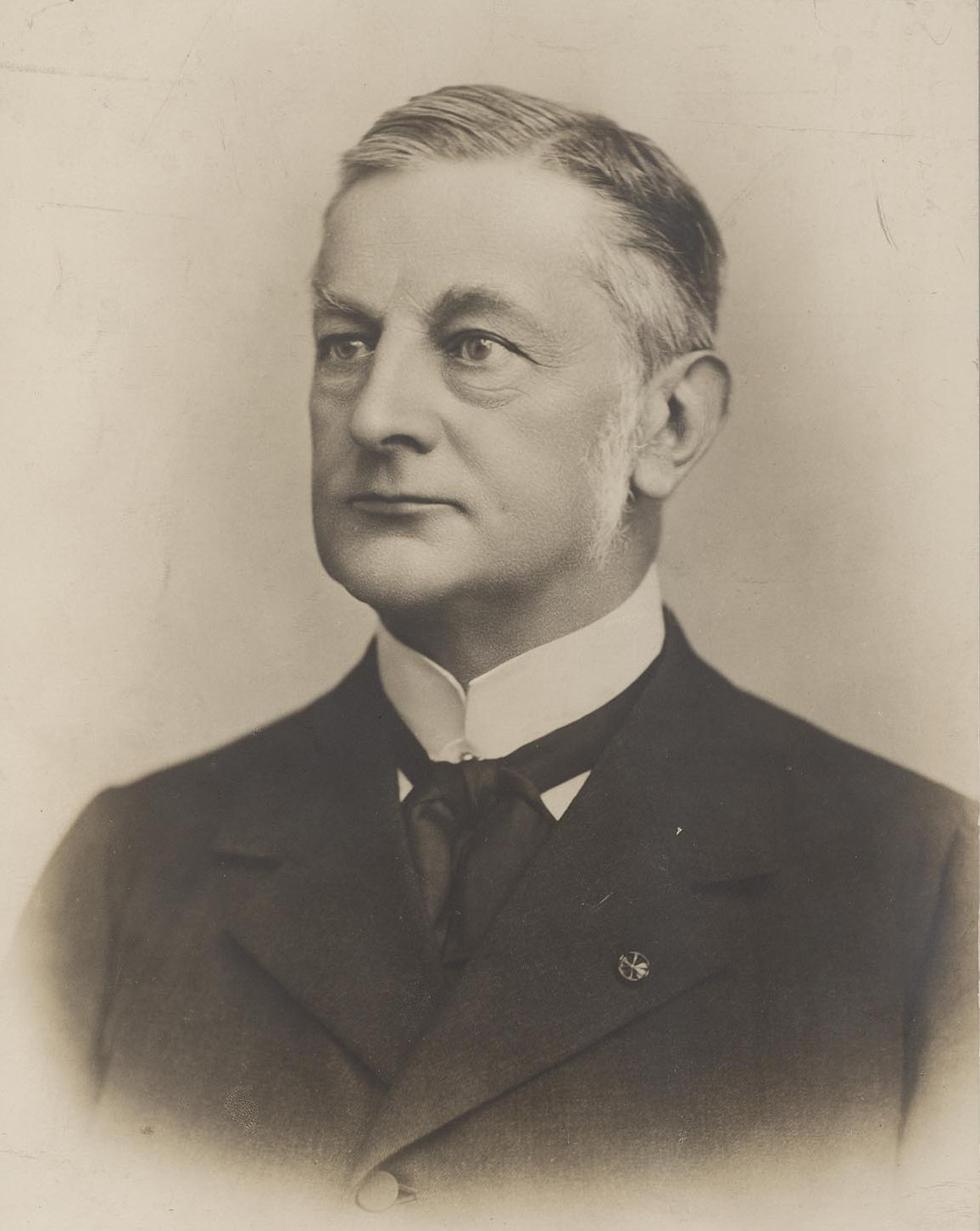
Alexander de Savornin Lohman broke with the ARP in the 1890s and became the founder of the Christian Historical Union.

The Coalition returned to the opposition benches in 1891, and the new liberal government introduced a bill which would have effectively enfranchised nearly all male adults. This proposal split the Anti-Revolutionary Party in two groups. Kuyper, who intended for his party to represent kleine luyden, or "small folk", supported the bill. However, a number of Anti-Revolutionaries led by Alexander de Savornin Lohman were more reluctant to support extension of suffrage. Other issues also became the source of division between the two groups. Firstly, De Savornin Lohman's group rejected the party discipline which Kuyper had expected of his MPs, instead valuing the independence of representatives. Secondly, the group was still strongly anti-papist, and thus rejected Kuyper's antithesis. Thirdly, the group generally represented Protestants who had not joined Kuyper's Doleantie and remained Hervormd. De Savornin Lohman and his followers formed a separate parliamentary group after the 1894 general election, and founded the Free Anti-Revolutionary Party four years later. A series of mergers eventually led to the formation of the Christian Historical Union (CHU) in 1908.

After the Coalition won a majority in the 1901 general election, Kuyper came to lead the Kuyper cabinet including ARP and Catholic ministers, while De Savornin Lohman's group stayed out of the government but provided confidence and supply support. Schaepman's vision of a united Catholic party became a reality on 15 October 1904, a year after his death, when local Catholic electoral associations united to form the national General League of Roman Catholic Electoral Associations. In 1913 a liberal cabinet was formed which sought to address all the major political issues of the time in the Pacification of 1917, which involved the extension of suffrage, the implementation of proportional representation, and equalisation of school finance. Although in opposition, the Catholics and Protestants participated in the reform talks.

=== Pillarisation and dominance ===
The extension of suffrage proved especially favourable for the religious parties. From the 1918 election onward, one or more of those parties was always part of the government. Between 1918 and 1939 the Catholics, CHU, and ARP always formed the governing coalition, sometimes joined by liberals. The policy of these cabinets was characterised by conservatism: in the social sense, by strengthening pillarisation and enforcing public morality; in the economic sense, by keeping income and expenditure on the same level, which proved detrimental in the Great Depression; and in foreign policy, by adhering to armed neutrality and maintaining colonialism. These cabinets were led in turn by the Catholic Charles Ruijs de Beerenbrouck, the Anti-Revolutionary Hendrikus Colijn and the CHU politician Dirk Jan de Geer.

The extension of suffrage also gave smaller Christian Democratic parties a chance to enter Parliament. A pair of left-wing Protestant parties entered Parliament, the Christian Democratic Party and Christian Social Party, as did a pair of anti-papist orthodox religious parties, the Political Reformed Party (which is still represented in Parliament) and the Reformed Reformed State Party. In both pairs the first is the Gereformeerd and the second is the Hervormd variant. A smaller left-wing Catholic party also gained representation, the Roman Catholic People's Party. In response the Catholics reformed their party to the more centralised Roman Catholic State Party (RKSP).

Between 1940 and 1945 the Netherlands was occupied by Nazi Germany. Prominent Catholic and Protestant politicians were involved in resistance work, while their political leaders were in London, where they formed a national cabinet with the liberals and the socialists.

In 1945 the first cabinet was formed after the World War II. The Queen appointed an explicitly progressive cabinet composed of the KVP and the Labour Party (PvdA), a new party formed by the Social Democratic Workers' Party, the Free-thinking Democratic League, the left-wing Protestant CDU and several prominent Catholics. This started a series of Roman/Red cabinets formed by the KVP and PvdA, most of which were led by social democrat Willem Drees. The two main coalition partners, which gained around 30% of the vote were joined by smaller parties, including the CHU and the ARP, which gained only 10% of the vote. The cabinets were progressive and implemented a broad range of reforms—including the formation of a welfare state, a mixed economy, decolonisation of the Dutch East Indies, and joining NATO and the European Economic Community. Decolonisation, which the ARP and prominent KVP members opposed, led to a split within the KVP and resulted in the formation in 1948 of the short-lived Catholic National Party. A religious conflict within the Dutch Reformed Church in the same year split the ARP and the Reformed Political League.

=== Decline and unification ===
In the 1960s the position of the religious parties weakened. In 1957 they swapped the PvdA for the conservative liberal People's Party for Freedom and Democracy (VVD). This led to internal dissent. More importantly however the religious parties were affected by the decline of pillarisation. Since the mid-1960s, the Christian democrats had lost the majority and needed to rely on the VVD. In 1968 a group of left-wing, labour-oriented Catholics broke away from the KVP to form the Political Party of Radicals, and in 1971 they were joined by prominent Protestants. It joined an alliance with the Labour Party and the progressive liberal Democrats 66 (D'66). This alliance was unsuccessful at gaining a majority however in the 1971 and 1972 elections and they were forced to form a tenuous coalition with the KVP and ARP.

Meanwhile, pressured by their declining popularity, the KVP, ARP and CHU formed a federation in 1973. They fought the 1977 elections under a single electoral list, the Christian Democratic Appeal (CDA), which became a unified party in 1980. The formation of this centre-right broad Christian democratic party led to splits: on the right flank by the anti-papist orthodox reformed (the Reformed Political Party) and on the left by radical evangelicals (the Evangelical People's Party). Between 1977 and 1994 the CDA was the largest partner in a coalition with either the conservative liberals (1977–81; 1982–89) or the social democrats (1981–82; 1989–94), and always with a CDA member as prime minister.

Ruud Lubbers, who served as prime minister from 1982 to 1984, personified the CDA's no-nonsense policies of welfare state reform and privatisation. In 1989 the two left-wing Christian parties merged with the Pacifist Socialist Party and the Communist Party of the Netherlands to form GroenLinks, a Green party without a strict Christian democratic profile.

In 1994 the CDA suffered a decisive electoral defeat. The party lost half its vote and was confined to opposition for the first time in its history. It was also the first time since 1918 that a Christian Democratic Party was not part of the government. Over the next eight years, it took this period to renew its political program. Meanwhile, the orthodox Protestant RPF and the GPV merged to form the social-Christian Christian Union. In the 2002 elections, which were characterised by considerable insecurity, the CDA performed particularly well. CDA leader Jan Peter Balkenende served as prime minister for eight years, first heading a right-wing cabinet with the populist Pim Fortuyn List and the People's Party for Freedom and Democracy, a centrist cabinet with the VVD and the Democrats 66 and since 2007 a centre-left cabinet with the Labour Party and the Christian Union.

The CDA was roundly defeated in the 2010 election, but managed to become junior partner in a government led by the VVD.

The CDA won 5 seats in the 2023 Dutch general election and got 3.3% of the popular vote. The lowest vote share and number of seats in the party's history. However, another, more socially oriented Christian democratic party, New Social Contract, won 12.88% of the popular vote and 20 seats in the House of Representatives, joining the new government.

== Timeline ==
Simplified timeline of the Christian Democratic Appeal and its precursors
1879	1897–98	1903–04	1908	1926	1945	1980
Anti-Revolutionary Party						Christian Democratic Appeal
Anti-Revolutionary Party	Free Anti-Revolutionary Party	Christian Historical Party	Christian Historical Union			Christian Democratic Appeal
	Christian Historical Voters' League	Christian Historical Party	Christian Historical Union			Christian Democratic Appeal
	Frisian League		Christian Historical Union			Christian Democratic Appeal
		General League		Roman Catholic State Party	Catholic People's Party	Christian Democratic Appeal

== See also ==
- History of the Netherlands
- Politics of the Netherlands
- List of political parties in the Netherlands
- Anarchism in the Netherlands
- Liberalism in the Netherlands
- Socialism in the Netherlands
