= Jim de Booy =

Dutch politician

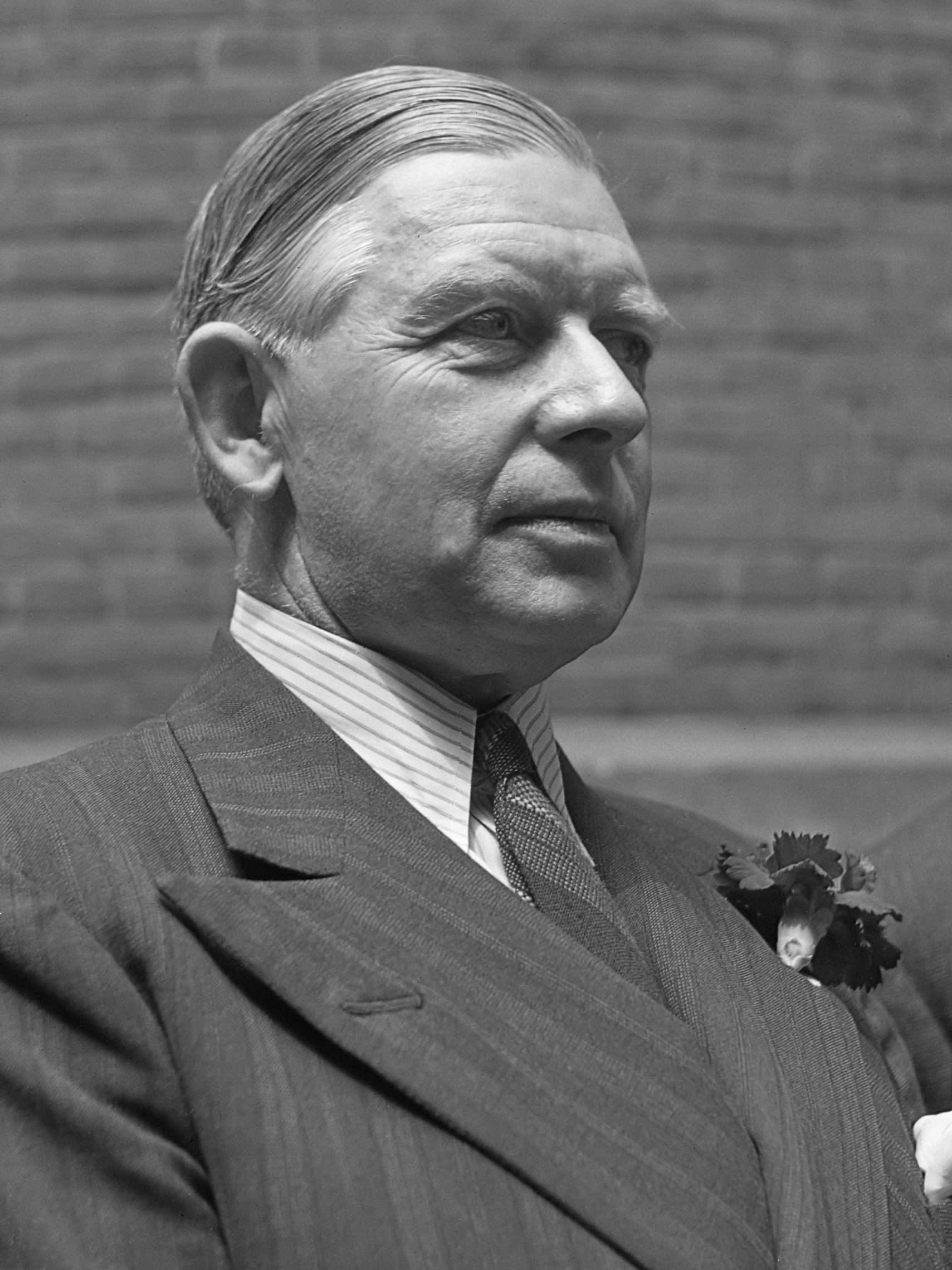
Jim de Booy (1945)

James Marnix de Booy (born de Booij; 24 July 1885, Kralingen – 1 March 1969, Lausanne) was a Dutch politician and member of the Dutch resistance.

De Booy was a liberal entrepreneur and government minister. During his naval career he was commander of several submarines. After his naval career, he worked in business and followed an international career with Bataafse Petroleum Maatschappij. On 14 May 1940 he escaped to England (an Engelandvaarder) and in London, he was a member of the advisory board and extraordinary of shipping and commerce committee and appointed in 1944 as Minister of Marine and Fisheries. In the post-war cabinet of Schermerhorn-Drees, he was also the Navy minister. He then became the first Dutch ambassador in Bonn. For his war-time political activities in exile he was awarded the Medal of Freedom.

He was member of the "Raad der Vereniging" of De Nederlandsche Padvinders.
