= 1941 Dutch cabinet formation =

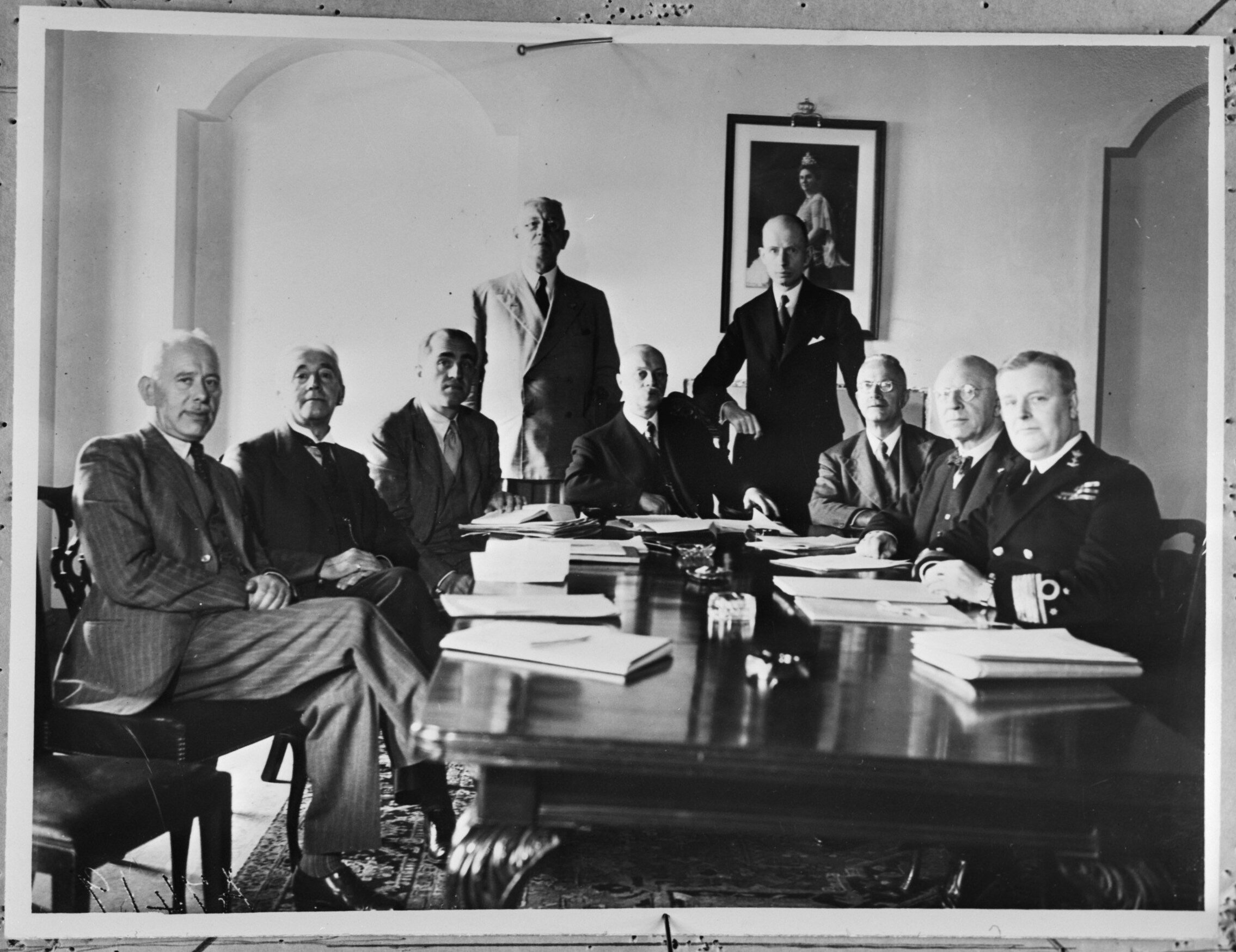
The second Gerbrandy cabinet, July 1941

A cabinet formation took place after the first Gerbrandy cabinet, the Dutch government-in-exile, resigned on 1 July 1941. The cabinet had resigned after queen Wilhelmina had lost the confidence in minister of Defence Adriaan Dijxhoorn, who subsequently resigned. Prime minister Pieter Gerbrandy was given the assignment to form a cabinet. The plans of Gerbrandy and the queen to, amongst others, create a war cabinet were opposed by some of the other ministers. On 27 July, a new minister was appointed, marking the start of the second Gerbrandy cabinet.

== Background ==
The first Gerbrandy cabinet had been in office as the Dutch government-in-exile since September 1940. The cabinet was formed during the 1940 cabinet formation, after queen Wilhelmina had requested the resignation of prime minister Dirk Jan de Geer. The queen subsequently also lost confidence in the minister of Defence, Adriaan Dijxhoorn. Prime minister Pieter Gerbrandy, however, foresaw that Dijxhoorn's dismissal would lead to the departure of other ministers.

A conflict surrounding David van Voorst Evekink ultimately proved to be the final straw. Van Voorst Evekink was the head of the Bureau of Special Affairs, which was responsible for preparations for the return to the Netherlands. The queen wanted Van Voorst Evekink removed from his position, but Dijxhoorn refused. He was not supported by the Council of Ministers in this matter. When Van Voorst Evekink had still not been dismissed by 10 June, the queen told Dijxhoorn she had no confidence in him and encouraged him to resign. On 11 June, he tendered his resignation, which was accepted the next day.

During the 11 June cabinet meeting, Max Steenberghe sided with Dijxhoorn. He wanted the cabinet to offer their portfolios collectively, or else he would resign alone. The decision was made to wait for ministers Charles Welter and Eelco van Kleffens, who were in the United States, to collectively determine the course of action. On 1 July, the cabinet offered its portfolios to the queen.

== Formateur Gerbrandy ==
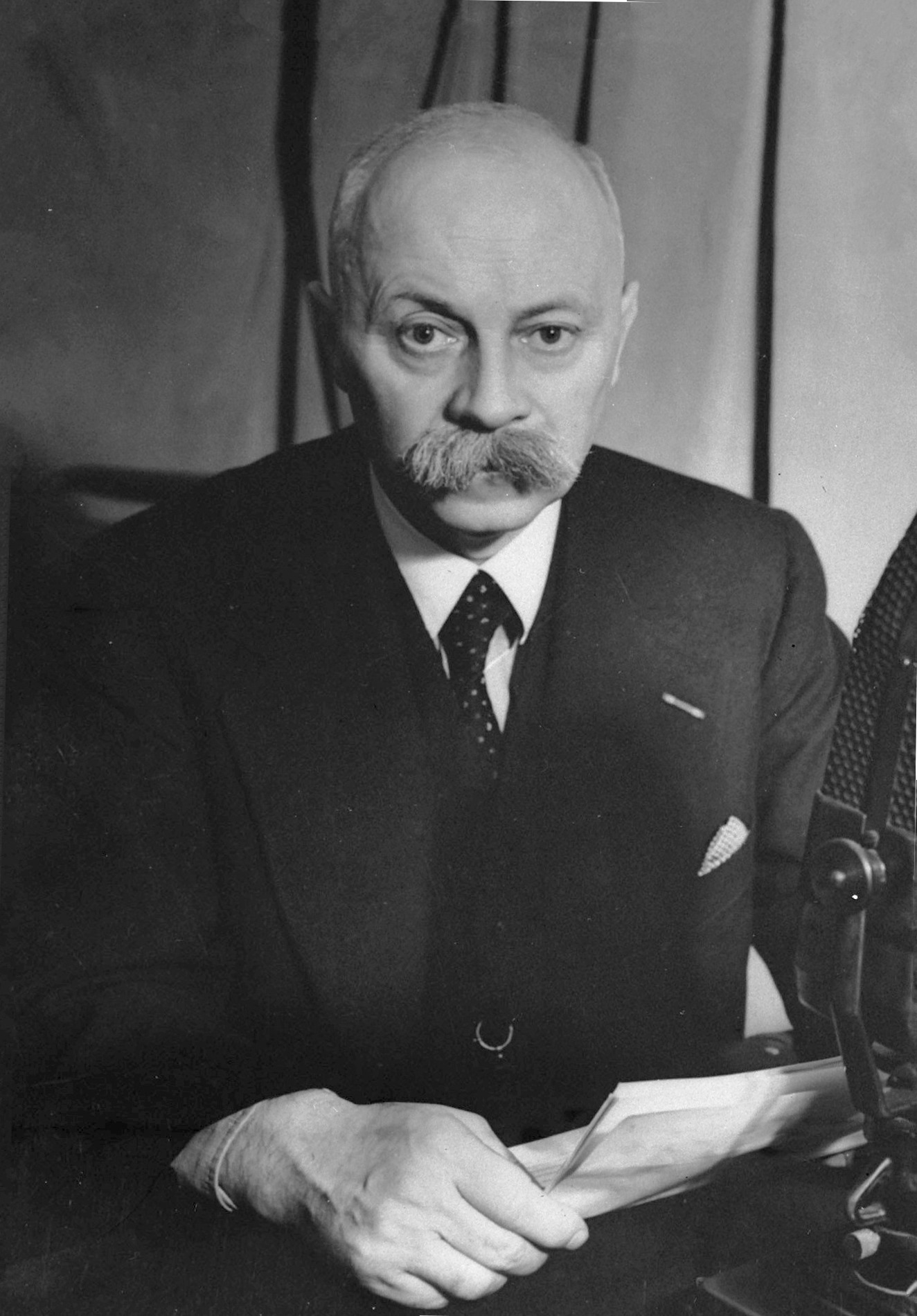
Formateur Pieter Gerbrandy, 23 September 1941

Oral instructions given by the queen to Gerbrandy after the Council of Ministers on 11 June tasked him with "reconstructing the cabinet so that cooperation toward the single great goal, the liberation of the motherland, could be raised to its highest level." As formateur, however, he could only begin his work after 1 July. In the meantime, he had approached Binnert Philip van Harinxma thoe Slooten to serve as minister of Defence. Van Harinxma was the authorised representative in Lisbon for the Government Commissioner for Dutch refugees. His appointment ultimately did not proceed.

The queen wanted Johan Furstner, Commander of the Naval Forces, to become minister of a newly separated Ministry of the Navy. Additionally, she wanted the formation of a "royal cabinet", composed by the Crown and united under the Crown's agenda. Gerbrandy interpreted this as meaning the queen would handle more matters directly with individual ministers, while the prime minister would receive extensive new powers. Hendrik van Boeijen would remain acting minister of War, and Willem Albarda, Gerrit Bolkestein, and Jan van den Tempel would continue as ministers without portfolio. The Council of Ministers would meet only every two weeks. This would create a war cabinet consisting of Gerbrandy, Van Boeijen, Furstner, Van Kleffens, Steenberghe and Welter, under strong influence from the queen.

Gerbrandy first discussed this plan with Albarda and Bolkestein. Bolkestein was willing to comply, while Albarda protested but did not say he would resign. Through them, Van den Tempel learned of the plan on 2 July and informed Gerbrandy that he would not remain as a minister under such an arrangement. Steenberghe and Welter also opposed the plan.

In an attempt to persuade them, Gerbrandy sent a memorandum titled "The Crisis at Defence" on 10 July to the ministers and Furstner, defending his proposals. A Repatriation Committee, consisting of Gerbrandy, Van Boeijen, Furstner, and when necessary Steenberghe, was to make preparations for the return to the Netherlands. It also included concessions: Steenberghe would additionally take on Finance, and Van den Tempel would be given Water Management and Education, Arts and Sciences. Another concession, supported by Steenberghe and Welter, was the resignation of François van 't Sant as head of the Central Intelligence Service. The discussions continued for another two weeks, but Steenberghe, Van den Tempel and Welter persisted in their opposition.

In the end, only part of Gerbrandy's plans were implemented. His coordinating authority was recognised, but with reservations. Furstner became minister, Van Boeijen remained acting minister of Defence and Steenberghe became acting minister of Finance. The war cabinet plan was ultimately rejected; the queen would not be permitted to discuss matters directly with individual ministers, and the Repatriation Committee would be given only a preparatory role. On 27 July, Furstner was appointed, marking the start of the second Gerbrandy cabinet. A day later he was sworn in.

== Aftermath ==
Gerbrandy's actions had caused resentment among the other ministers, especially Steenberghe. Bolkestein predicted at the end of July 1941: "This won't last three months". In October 1941, Steenberghe and his party colleague Welter offered their resignation, partly because they believed Gerbrandy was acting too independently and wilfully.

== Sources ==
- Fasseur, Cees (2014). Eigen meester, niemands knecht. Het leven van Pieter Sjoerds Gerbrandy 1885-1961 (in Dutch). Amsterdam: Balans. ISBN 978-94-6003-336-0.
- De Jong, L. (1979). Het Koninkrijk der Nederlanden in de Tweede Wereldoorlog. Deel 9 Londen. Eerste helft (in Dutch). The Hague: Nijhoff. ISBN 978-90-12-02090-9.
