= Roman/Red =

Period of Dutch politics, c. 1945 to 1958

Roman/Red (Dutch: Rooms/rood) is the nickname for a period in Dutch politics between approximately 1945 and 1958. This period was characterized by coalitions between the Catholic and social-democratic parties in the Netherlands and Belgium. "Roman" refers to the parties with Roman Catholic affiliation, and "red" refers to the colour associated with social democrats. During the Roman/Red period, the Catholic People's Party (KVP) and the social-democratic Labour Party (PvdA) formed the core of several 'Roman/Red' cabinets, led primarily by Willem Drees.

After the Catholic KVP merged with two Protestant parties to form the non-denominational Christian Democratic Appeal (CDA) in 1980, the term has been used less frequently in Dutch politics. In Belgian politics, the term is still used to describe cabinets made up out of the predominantly Catholic Christian Democratic & Flemish party (CD&V) and Humanist Democratic Centre (cdH) and the social-democratic Socialist Party Different (SP.A) and Socialist Party (PS).

The German equivalent is the Grand coalition.

== Background ==
Immediately prior to the German invasion of the Netherlands in 1940, the Second De Geer cabinet (1939-1940) included social democrats for the first time. This coalition is known as the first of the London Cabinets, as Dutch government officials had to flee the country following the German annexation, and operated out of London. The first London Cabinet fell in August 1940, following a conflict between Prime Minister Dirk Jan de Geer and Queen Wilhelmina. This cabinet was followed by the First Gebrandy cabinet (1940-1941), the Second Gebrandy cabinet (1941-1945), and the Third Gebrandy cabinet (1945-1945).

== Roman/Red Cabinets in the Netherlands ==
=== Schermerhorn-Drees Cabinet (June 1945- July 1946) ===
The Schermerhorn-Drees cabinet, created by royal decree following the end of World War II, was formed by the Roman Catholic State Party (RKSP), the Social Democratic Workers' Party (SDAP), and the Free-thinking Democratic League (VDB). The cabinet, headed by Prime Minister Schermerhorn and Deputy Prime Minister Drees, had the primary objectives of starting economic recovery following the German occupation, as well as preparing to hold elections. The cabinet resigned on May 17, 1946, and the Queen granted the resignation on July 3, 1946.

=== First Beel Cabinet (July 1946-August 1948) ===
The First Beel cabinet was the first cabinet formed following the elections in 1946. Following the war, the RKSP changed its name to the KVP (Dutch: Katholieke Volkspartij). The KVP allied with the PvdA, a collaboration known as 'the new file' (Dutch: 'het nieuwe bestand"), to form the first Roman-Red coalition. This cabinet notably dealt with the Indonesian War of Independence, in which the Dutch East Indies sought to be free of colonial control. This cabinet was responsible for the negotiation and ratification the Linggadjati Agreement, which sought to resolve the dispute between Indonesia and the Netherlands. However, neither side was happy with the terms of the agreement, which led the Dutch to launch a military offensive, Operation Product, in an attempt to reconquer the area. This cabinet ended following parliamentary elections held in 1948.

=== Drees-Van Schaik Cabinet (August 1948-March 1951) ===
The Drees-Van Schaik cabinet was a coalition of the KVP, the Christian Historical Union (CHU), the PvdA, and the People's Party for Freedom and Democracy (VVD). Under this cabinet, another military offensive was carried out against Indonesia, Operation Kraai. In 1949, following negotiations, the United States of Indonesia was created establishing Indonesian sovereignty, although the newly created state was replaced less than a year after its creation.

In 1949, the Netherlands entered NATO.

The Drees-Van Schaik cabinet ended after the VVD parliamentary party passed a motion of no confidence regarding governmental policy on New Guinea.

=== First Drees Cabinet (March 1951-September 1952) ===
The First Drees Cabinet was a coalition of the KVP, the CHU, the PvdA, and the VVD. The cabinet was primarily engaged in the recovery and rebuilding following World War II. It was ended following parliamentary elections held in 1952.

=== Second Drees Cabinet (September 1952-October 1956) ===
The Second Drees cabinet was a coalition of the KVP, the Anti-Revolutionary Party (ARP), and the CHU, created following the election of 1952. The VVD, which participated in previous Roman/Red coalitions, was replaced by the ARP.

On February 1, 1953, the North Sea flood caused widespread damage to the Netherlands. In 1954, the Netherlands signed the European Convention for the Protection of Human Rights. On February 15, 1956, Indonesia officially left the Dutch-Indonesian Union, and relationships between the two countries continued to deteriorate. This coalition completed its entire term, and ended following parliamentary elections held in 1956.

=== Third Drees Cabinet (October 1956-December 1958) ===
The final Roman/Red coalition, created following the elections of 1956, was made of the KVP, the CHU, the ARP, and the PvdA. On December 11, 1958, the Third Drees cabinet fell after a crisis arose between PvdA and KVP regarding a proposed tax increase.

== Following the end of the Roman/Red coalition in the Netherlands ==
The Third Drees Cabinet was succeeded by the Second Beel Cabinet, which consisted of a coalition between only the KVP, the ARP, and the CHU. This marked the end of the "Roman/Red" coalition, creating a new period in which the three Christian parties, KVP, ARP, and CHU, predominately controlled parliament. Those three Christian parties consolidated into a single party in 1980, becoming the Christian Democratic Appeal (CDA).
