= 1940 Dutch cabinet formation =

Formation of the first Gerbrandy cabinet

A cabinet formation took place after the second De Geer cabinet, the Dutch government-in-exile resigned on 26 August 1940. The cabinet had resigned after queen Wilhelmina had requested the resignation of prime minister Dirk Jan de Geer. The queen Wilhelmina subsequently insisted on Pieter Gerbrandy as formateur and new prime minister. After refusing twice, Gerbrandy felt compelled to accept the assignment on 28 August. On 3 September, the first Gerbrandy cabinet took office, differing from the previous cabinet only by the absence of De Geer.

== Background ==
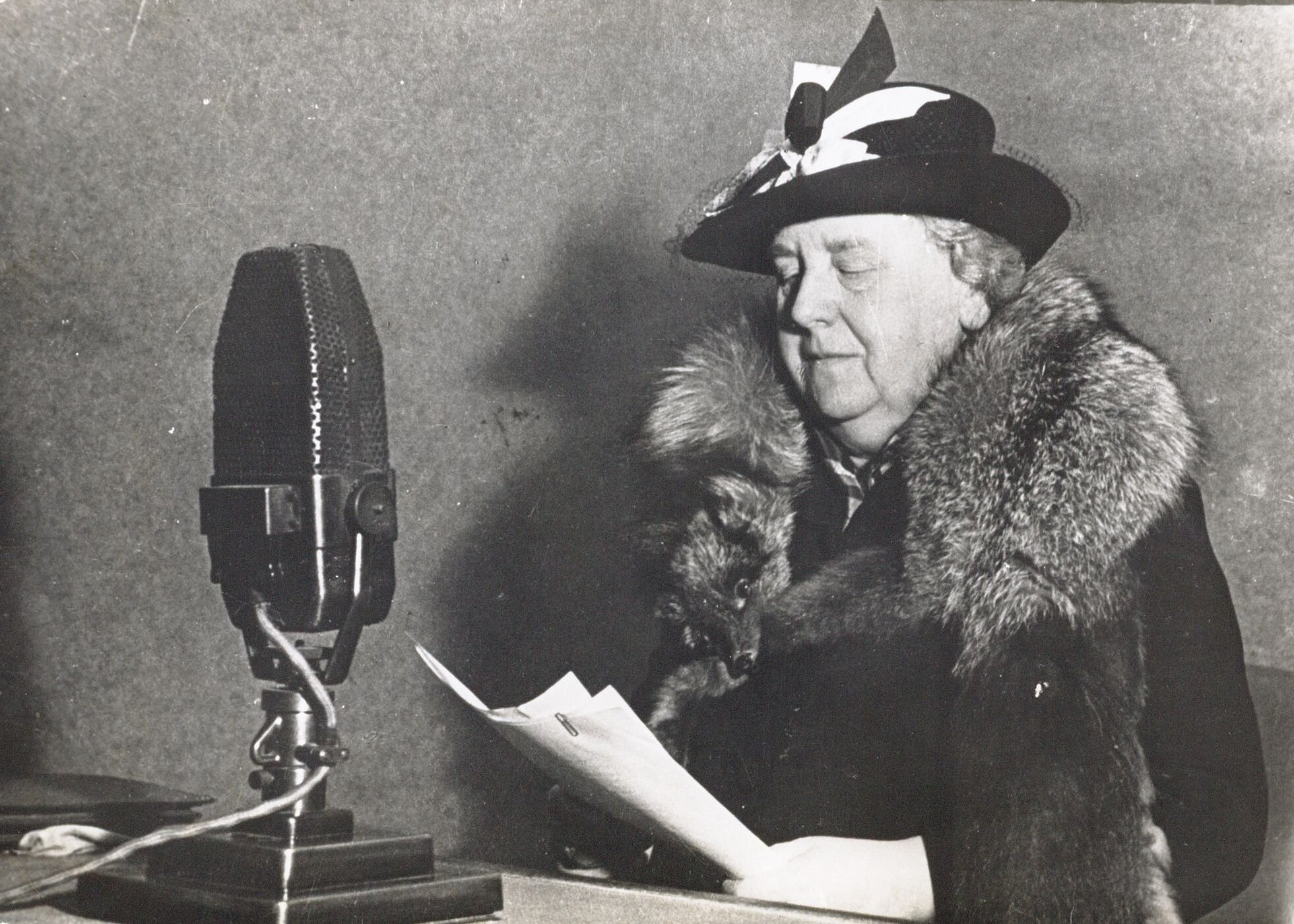
Queen Wilhelmina during a radio address on Radio Oranje

During the German invasion of the Netherlands in May 1940, the second De Geer cabinet and queen Wilhelmina fled to London and continued as the Dutch government-in-exile. Wilhelmina quickly became dissatisfied with the cabinet's defeatist attitude, particularly that of prime minister Dirk Jan de Geer (CHU). She was disappointed in the cabinet's lack of response to the Dutch capitulation by Henri Winkelman on 14 May 1940, and the radio address by De Geer on 20 May. She dismissed the idea of moving the seat of government to the Dutch East Indies at the end of June 1940. De Geer, on the other hand, wanted to limit the number of broadcasts by Radio Oranje, which Wilhelmina used to communicate to the Dutch people.

The final straw occurred in August 1940, when she learned that De Geer intended to go on holiday in Switzerland. (Note: In the end this was not possible, as there were no longer flights between Spain and Switzerland) She also realised the other ministers would not turn on De Geer. The Dutch Constitution limits the actions of the queen; she may only act if ministers are willing to take responsibility for those actions. She sought advice from Vice-President of the Council of State Frans Beelaerts van Blokland, and ministers Eelco van Kleffens and Pieter Gerbrandy. Van Kleffens and Gerbrandy believed she was permitted to act in this case. Beelaerts' advice is not known, but according to historian Lou de Jong, it was undoubtedly also positive.

On 23 August, the queen asked De Geer to resign. When De Geer inquired whether she meant as prime minister or as minister of Finance, she indicated she wanted to think about it further. That same day, the Council of Ministers discussed the request. Everyone except Gerbrandy agreed to visit the queen to ask that De Geer be retained as minister of finance to prevent unrest among the population. The following day, ministers Van Kleffens, Willem Albarda, and Charles Welter visited the queen. On 25 August, the queen informed De Geer that she did not want him to remain as either prime minister or minister of Finance. In response, the entire cabinet tendered their resignation the next day.

== Formateur Gerbrandy ==
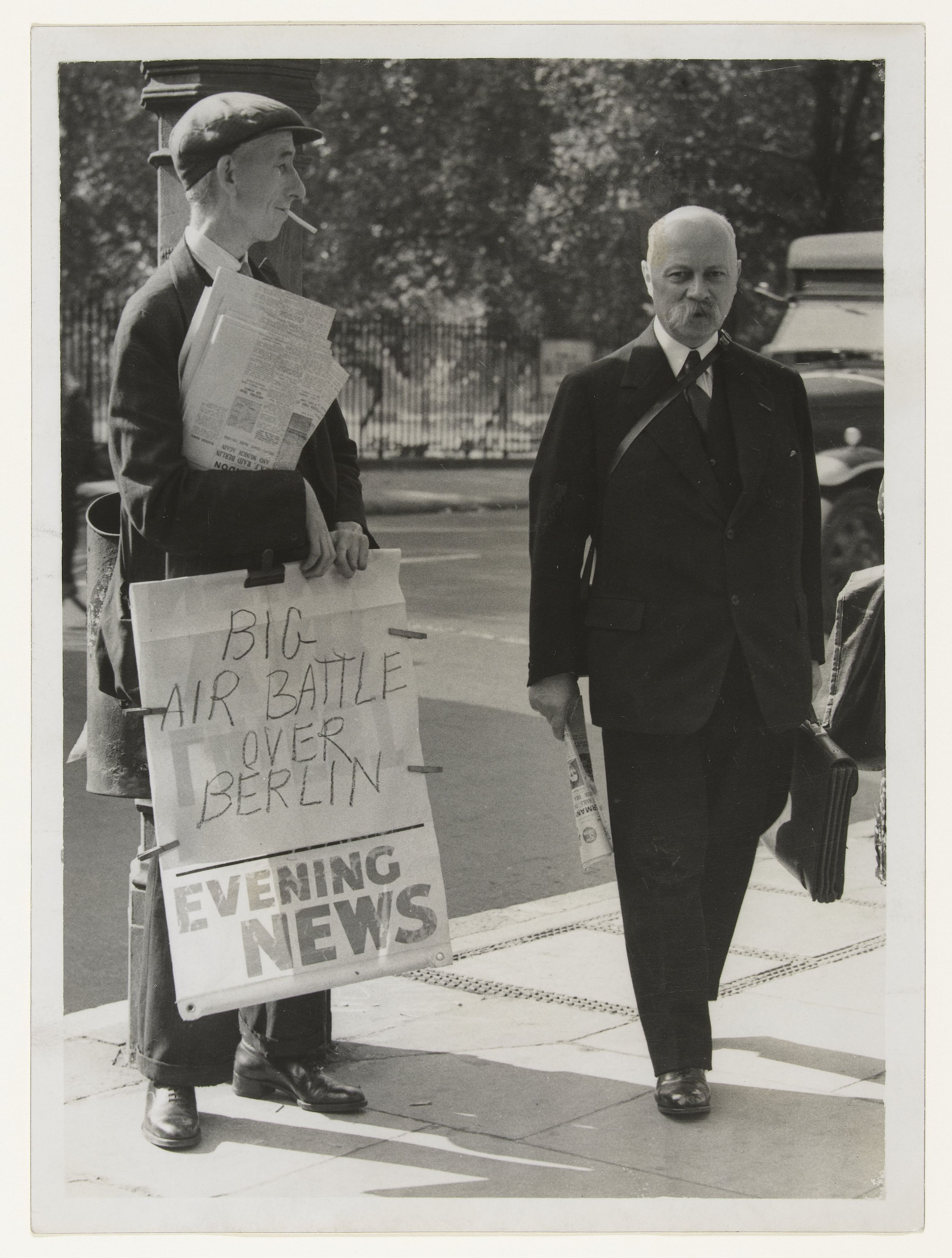
Prime minister Pieter Gerbrandy, 4 September 1940

On the same day the resignation was tendered, the queen received Gerbrandy and asked him to become formateur and prime minister. She set three conditions: minister Jan van den Tempel (PvdA) had to return to the cabinet, the cabinet had to commit to preparing for the material help of the Netherlands after liberation as a government task, and the cabinet had to resign after liberation. Gerbrandy, it later turned out, had no objection to these conditions but still declined the request. He pointed to Van Kleffens, who had also been recommended by Beelaerts, but the queen rejected this suggestion. At the end of the meeting, Gerbrandy promised to consider the matter further.

The next day, Gerbrandy spoke with ministers Hendrik van Boeijen, Adriaan Dijxhoorn, Van Kleffens, Max Steenberghe, and Welter. The request was not received enthusiastically. Gerbrandy asked Van Kleffens if he would take on the role, but he declined. In the evening, Gerbrandy asked the queen to withdraw her request, but she continued to urge him insistently. Gerbrandy then spoke again with Steenberghe, Van Boeijen, and Welter. By this time, they considered refusing the assignment unacceptable, which also convinced Gerbrandy. On 28 August, he ultimately accepted the task of forming a cabinet as formateur.

Gerbrandy visited De Geer to inform him about his new assignment. De Geer assumed Gerbrandy was offering him a position in the cabinet, but Gerbrandy made it clear that he did not intend to do so. Gerbrandy first asked Gerrit Bolkestein to stay on, followed by the rest of the cabinet. The Finance portfolio was assigned to Welter and General Affairs to Van Boeijen. By 30 August, Gerbrandy had finalised his cabinet, but the announcement was postponed until after Queen's Day on 31 August.

On 1 September, Gerbrandy formulated the cabinet programme, which included the conditions of the queen. On 2 September, Gerbrandy informed the queen that the formation had been successful. The following day, De Geer was granted his resignation, and the first Gerbrandy cabinet officially took office.

== Sources ==
- De Jong, L. (1979). Het Koninkrijk der Nederlanden in de Tweede Wereldoorlog. Deel 9 Londen. Eerste helft (in Dutch). The Hague: Nijhoff. ISBN 978-90-12-02090-9.
