= Aat van Rhijn =

Dutch politician (1892–1986)

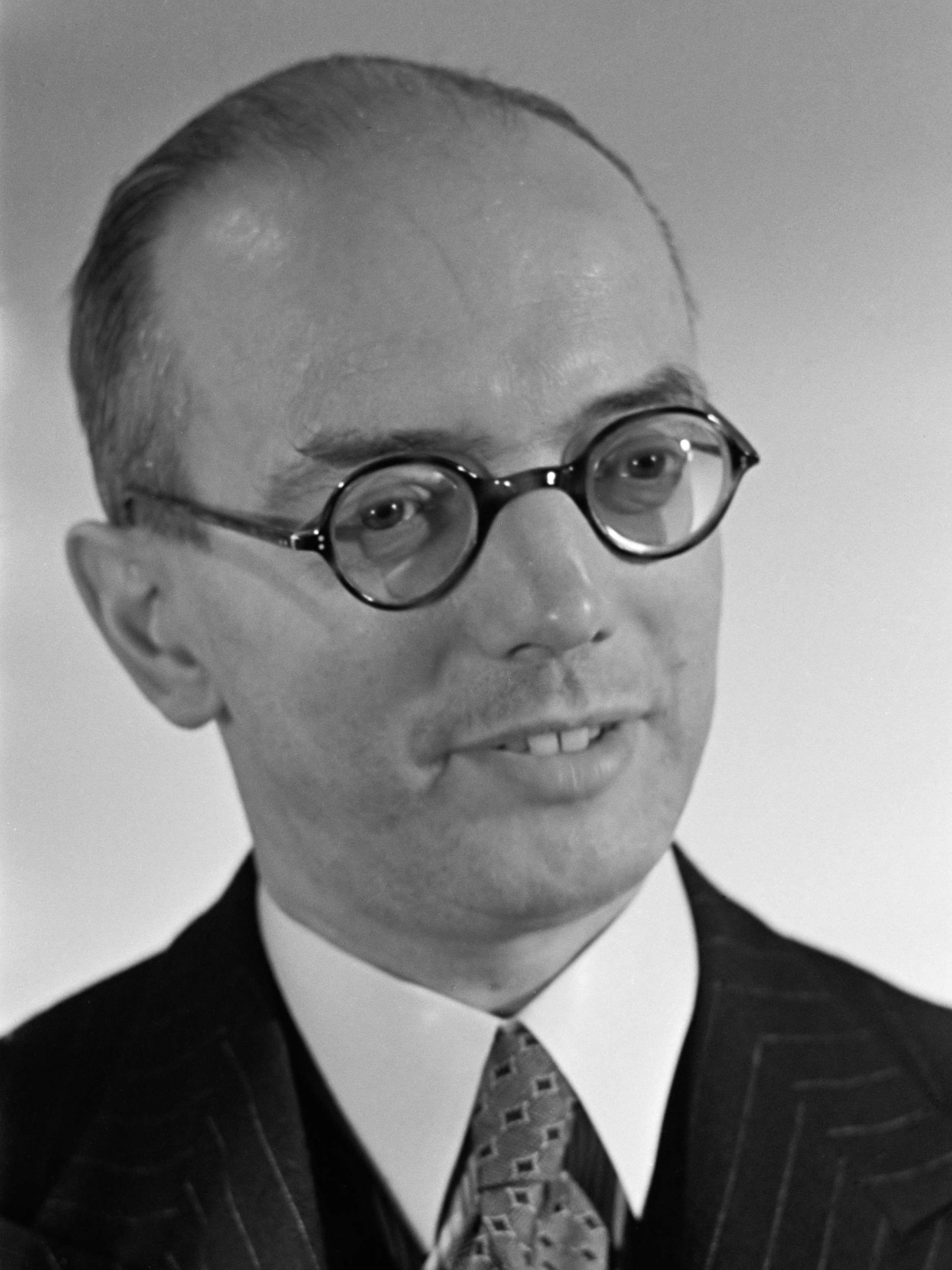
- Aat van Rhijn in 1944

Member of the Council of State
- In office 1 October 1960 – 1 November 1967
- Vice President: Louis Beel

Member of the House of Representatives
- In office 3 July 1956 – 3 October 1956
- Parliamentary group: Labour Party

State Secretary for Social Affairs and Health
- In office 15 September 1951 – 22 December 1958 Serving with Piet Muntendam (1951–1953)
- Prime Minister: Willem Drees
- Preceded by: Himself as State Secretary for Social Affairs
- Succeeded by: Bauke Roolvink

State Secretary for Social Affairs
- In office 15 February 1950 – 15 September 1951 Serving with Piet Muntendam
- Prime Minister: Willem Drees
- Preceded by: Office established
- Succeeded by: Himself as State Secretary for Social; Affairs and Health

President of the Court of Audit
- In office 1 May 1941 – 15 July 1945; Ad interim
- Preceded by: Rudolph Zuyderhoff
- Succeeded by: Theodorus Sanders

Minister of Agriculture and Fisheries
- In office 8 May 1940 – 1 May 1941
- Prime Minister: Dirk Jan de Geer (1940); Pieter Sjoerds Gerbrandy (1940–1941)
- Preceded by: Max Steenberghe as Minister of Economic Affairs
- Succeeded by: Max Steenberghe

Personal details
- Born: Arie Adriaan van Rhijn; 23 October 1892 Groningen, Netherlands
- Died: 11 February 1986 (aged 93) The Hague, Netherlands
- Party: Labour Party (from 1946)
- Other political affiliations: Christian Historical Union (1912–1946)
- Education: University of Groningen (Bachelor of Laws, Master of Laws); Utrecht University (Bachelor of Public Administration, Master of Public Administration, Doctor of Philosophy)
- Occupation: Politician · civil servant · jurist · economist · researcher · corporate director · nonprofit director · trade association executive · author

Arie Adriaan "Aat" van Rhijn (23 October 1892 – 11 February 1986) was a Dutch politician of the defunct Christian Historical Union (CHU) party and later of the Labour Party (PvdA) and jurist.

Van Rhijn worked as a researcher at the Utrecht University from April 1918 until July 1920 and as a civil servant for the Ministry of Water Management from June 1918 until July 1919. Van Rhijn worked as a trade association executive for the Publishing companies association (NUV) from July 1919 until January 1928 and also the Christian Employers' association (NCW) from April 1926 until January 1928. Van Rhijn worked as a civil servant for the Ministry of Labour, Commerce and Industry as Director-General of the department for Public Health from January 1928 until June 1933 and for the Ministry of Economic Affairs as Secretary-General of the Ministry of the Economic Affairs from June 1933 until May 1940 and also for the Ministry of Agriculture and Fisheries as Secretary-General of the Ministry Agriculture and Fisheries from September 1935 until June 1937. Van Rhijn was appointed as Minister of Agriculture and Fisheries in the Cabinet De Geer II after the Ministry of Agriculture and Fisheries was officially split from the Ministry of Economic Affairs, taking office on 8 May 1940. On 10 May 1940 Nazi Germany invaded the Netherlands and the government fled to London to escape the German occupation. The Cabinet De Geer II fell on 26 August 1940 after a conflict between Queen Wilhelmina and Prime Minister Dirk Jan de Geer and continued to serve in a demissionary capacity until it was replaced by the Cabinet Gerbrandy I with Van Rhijn continuing as Minister of Agriculture and Fisheries, taking office on 3 September 1940. In April 1941 Van Rhijn was nominated as a Member of the Court of Audit but because the President of the Court of Audit Rudolph Zuyderhoff stayed behind after the government fled to London Van Rhijn became the De facto President of the Court of Audit, he resigned as Minister of Agriculture and Fisheries the day he was installed as President of the Court of Audit, taking office on 1 May 1941.

Following the end of World War II Van Rhijn returned as a civil servant for the Ministry of Social Affairs as Secretary-General of the Ministry of Social Affairs in July 1945. On 9 February 1946 the Social Democratic Workers' Party (SDAP), the Free-thinking Democratic League (VDB) and the Christian Democratic Union (CDU) choose to merge to form the Labour Party (PvdA), Van Rhijn left the Christian Historical Union and joined the new Labour Party. Van Rhijn was appointed as State Secretary for Social Affairs in the Cabinet Drees–Van Schaik, taking office on 15 February 1950. The Cabinet Drees–Van Schaik fell on 24 January 1951 and continued to serve in a demissionary capacity until the cabinet formation of 1951 when it was replaced by Cabinet Drees I with Van Rhijn continuing as State Secretary for Social Affairs, taking office on 15 March 1951. On 15 September 1951 the Ministry of Social Affairs was renamed as the Ministry of Social Affairs and Health with Van Rhijn reappointed as State Secretary for Social Affairs and Health. After the election of 1952 Van Rhijn again continued as State Secretary for Social Affairs and Health in the Cabinet Drees II, taking office on 2 September 1952. Van Rhijn was elected as a Member of the House of Representatives after the election of 1956, taking office on 3 July 1956. Following the cabinet formation of 1956 Van Rhijn remained State Secretary for Social Affairs and Health in the Cabinet Drees III, taking office on 13 October 1956. The Cabinet Drees III fell on 11 December 1958 and continued to serve in a demissionary capacity until it was replaced by the caretaker Cabinet Beel II on 22 December 1958. In January 1959 Van Rhijn announced that he would not stand for the election of 1959. In September 1960 Van Rhijn was nominated as Member of the Council of State, serving from 1 October 1960 until 1 November 1967.

Van Rhijn was known for his abilities as a manager and policy wonk. He holds the distinction as the second longest-serving State Secretary for Social Affairs after Louw de Graaf with 8 years.

== Decorations ==
Honours
Ribbon bar	Honour	Country	Date	Comment
	Knight of the Order of the Netherlands Lion	Netherlands	6 May 1946	
	Officer of the Order of Leopold II	Belgium	21 March 1952	
	Knight of the Order of the Oak Crown	Luxembourg	8 March 1957	
	Commander of the Order of Orange-Nassau	Netherlands	22 December 1958	

Political offices
Preceded by Max Steenberghe as Minister of Economic Affairs	Minister of Agriculture and Fisheries; 1940–1941	Succeeded by Max Steenberghe
Preceded by Office established	State Secretary for Social Affairs; 1950–1951; With: Piet Muntendam	Succeeded by Himself as State Secretary for Social; Affairs and Health
Preceded by Himself as State Secretary for Social Affairs	State Secretary for Social; Affairs and Health; 1951–1958; With: Piet Muntendam (1951–1953)	Succeeded by Bauke Roolvink
Civic offices
Unknown	Director-General of the Department for Public Health of the Ministry of Labour, Commerce and Industry; 1928–1933	Unknown
Preceded by Arend Scholtens	Secretary-General of the Ministry of Economic Affairs; 1933–1940	Succeeded by Hans Hirschfeld; Ad interim
Preceded by Office established	Secretary-General of the Ministry of Agriculture and Fisheries; 1933–1937	Succeeded by Office discontinued
Preceded by Rudolph Zuyderhoff	President of the Court of Audit; Ad interim 1941–1945	Succeeded by Theodorus Sanders
Preceded by Robert Verwey	Secretary-General of the Ministry of Social Affairs; 1945–1950	Succeeded by Johann Klatte
