= Second De Geer cabinet =

Cabinet of the Netherlands, 1939 to 1940

Second De Geer cabinet First London cabinet
- Cabinet of the Netherlands

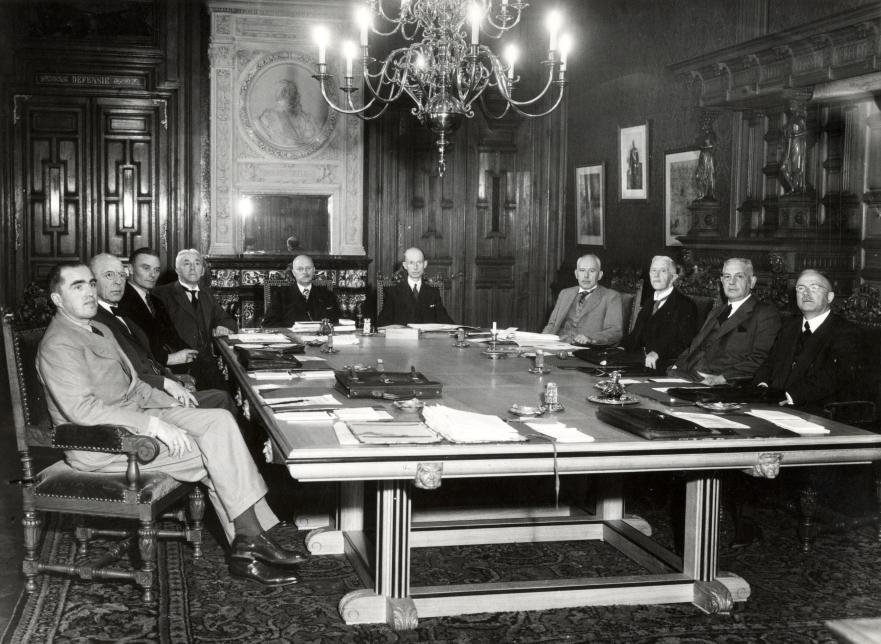
- The first meeting of the Second De Geer cabinet on 6 September 1939
- Date formed: 10 August 1939
- Date dissolved: 3 September 1940 (Demissionary from 26 August 1940)

People and organisations
- Head of state: Queen Wilhelmina
- Head of government: Dirk Jan de Geer
- No. of ministers: 11
- Member party: Roman Catholic State Party; Social Democratic Workers' Party; Anti-Revolutionary Party; Christian Historical Union; Free-thinking Democratic League
- Status in legislature: National unity government (War cabinet)

History
- Outgoing formation: 1940 Dutch cabinet formation
- Legislature terms: 1937–1946
- Predecessor: Fifth Colijn cabinet
- Successor: First Gerbrandy cabinet

The Second De Geer cabinet, also called the First London cabinet, was the cabinet of the Netherlands from 10 August 1939 until 3 September 1940. The cabinet was formed by the political parties Roman Catholic State Party (RKSP), Social Democratic Workers' Party (SDAP), Anti-Revolutionary Party (ARP), Christian Historical Union (CHU) and the Free-thinking Democratic League (VDB) following the dismissal of the Fifth Colijn cabinet by Queen Wilhelmina on 27 July 1939. It was the first government to include the social democratic SDAP, up to then they had been excluded from government by the other political parties. The national unity government became a War cabinet on 14 May 1940 following the German invasion and fled to London. The government-in-exile was dismissed by Queen Wilhelmina on 26 August 1940.

== Term ==
The cabinet fell on 26 August 1940 after a conflict between Queen Wilhelmina and Prime Minister Dirk Jan de Geer; the cabinet continued for one week as a demissionary cabinet until the First Gerbrandy cabinet was installed on 3 September 1940.

== Composition ==
Composition
Title	Minister			Term of office	
Title	Image	Name	Party	Start	End
Chairman of the Council of Ministers; Minister of General Affairs; Minister of Finance	Dirk Jan de Geer	Dirk Jan de Geer	CHU	10 August 1939	3 September 1940
Minister of the Interior	Hendrik van Boeijen	Hendrik van Boeijen	CHU	10 August 1939	3 September 1940
Minister of Foreign Affairs	Eelco van Kleffens	Eelco van Kleffens	Indep.	10 August 1939	3 September 1940
Minister of Justice	Pieter Sjoerds Gerbrandy	Pieter Sjoerds Gerbrandy	ARP	10 August 1939	3 September 1940
Minister of Economic Affairs (1939–1940); Minister of Commerce, Industry and Shipping (1940)	Max Steenberghe	Max Steenberghe	RKSP	10 August 1939	3 September 1940
Minister of Defence	Adriaan Dijxhoorn	Adriaan Dijxhoorn	Indep.	10 August 1939	3 September 1940
Minister of Social Affairs	Jan van den Tempel	Jan van den Tempel	SDAP	10 August 1939	3 September 1940
Minister of Education, Arts and Sciences	Gerrit Bolkestein	Gerrit Bolkestein	VDB	10 August 1939	3 September 1940
Minister of Water Management	Willem Albarda	Willem Albarda	SDAP	10 August 1939	3 September 1940
Minister of Agriculture and Fisheries	Aat van Rhijn	Aat van Rhijn	CHU	10 May 1940	3 September 1940
Minister of Colonial Affairs	Charles Welter	Charles Welter	RKSP	10 August 1939	3 September 1940
