= London Cabinet =

London Cabinet can refer to a number of Second World War government-in-exile cabinets based in the United Kingdom capital of London:

- Nygaardsvold's Cabinet, the Norwegian government-in-exile between 7 June 1940 and 31 May 1945
- One of the four Dutch governments-in-exile between 13 May 1940 and May 1945:
  - Second De Geer Cabinet
  - First Gerbrandy Cabinet
  - Second Gerbrandy Cabinet
  - Third Gerbrandy Cabinet

== See also ==
- List of British governments
