= Jan Andriessen =

Dutch politician (1894-1978)

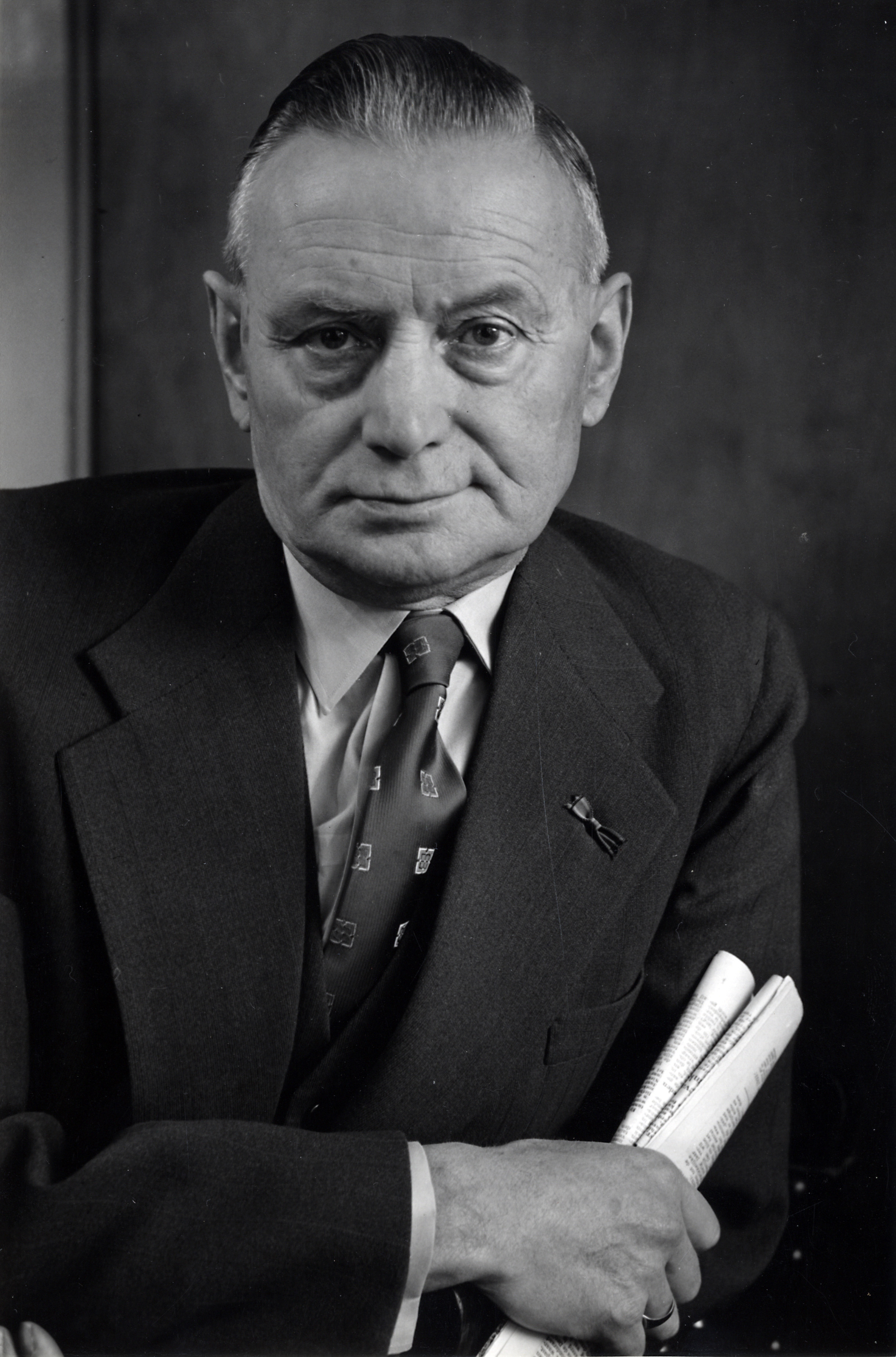
- Andriessen in 1956

Member of the Senate
- In office 18 July 1933 – 8 June 1937

Member of the House of Representatives
- In office 8 June 1937 – 22 February 1967

Personal details
- Born: Wilhelmus Johannes Andriessen; 24 February 1894 Goor, Netherlands
- Died: 18 June 1978 (aged 84) Bunnik, Netherlands
- Party: RKSP (until 1945); KVP (1945-1978)
- Spouse(s): Christina Maria Johanna Krispijn (m. 1924; died 1952) Gerarda van Miltenburg (m. 1958)
- Children: 10, including Frans

Wilhelmus Johannes "Jan" Andriessen (24 February 1894 - 18 June 1978) was a Dutch trade unionist and politician. He was a member of the Senate from 1933 to 1937 and a member of the House of Representatives from 1937 to 1967 for the Roman Catholic State Party (RKSP) and the Catholic People's Party (KVP).

== Early life ==
Jan Andriessen was born on 24 February 1894 in Goor, the eldest of 7 children. At the age of 13, Andriessen started working at a textile factory in Goor, but was fired in 1911 after which he went into construction. He quickly became involved with Catholic trade unionism, and became secretary of his local Catholic union branch at 17, and eventually became its chairman at age 24, which he would remain until 1946.

== Political career ==
In 1933, Andriessen became a member of the Senate for the Roman Catholic State Party (RKSP). He left the Senate in 1937 and was first elected to the House of Representatives in the general election of that year. As an MP, he focused on social issues, infrastructure, and housing.

In 1946, Andriessen became chairman of the Catholic People's Party (KVP) at the urging of union leader Adrianus Cornelis de Bruijn, who sought along with Andriessen to ensure the independence of the KVP and the Catholic labour movement from the Doorbraak movement seeking to merge them into a united Nederlandse Volksbeweging. He was heavily influenced by Catholic social teaching in his political ideology, which fit well into the Roman/Red coalition governments between the KVP and Labour Party (PvdA) of the late 1940s and 1950s. When Frans Duynstee heavily criticised the KVP in 1951 for having become too left-wing, Andriessen sought to reconcile the party's right-wing with its labour wing by promising an extra seat to the party's right wing and refusing to publicly state a coalition partner preference prior to the 1952 Dutch general election, while using his status within the Catholic unions to reassure the party's labour wing.

After the death of his first wife, Andriessen resigned as KVP chairman in 1953, though he remained an MP. In 1960, he temporarily served as parliamentary leader following the resignation of Carl Romme. He left the House of Representatives in 1967, marking the end of the close ties between the KVP and the Catholic labour movement, which would merge with the social democratic Dutch Confederation of Trade Unions (NVV) to form the Federation of Dutch Trade Unions (FNV). His son Frans Andriessen would become leader of the KVP from 1971 to 1977 and Minister of Finance from 1977 to 1981.

Jan Andriessen died on 18 June 1978 in Bunnik.
