= First Gerbrandy cabinet =

Dutch government-in-exile, 1940 to 1941

First Gerbrandy cabinet Second London cabinet
- Cabinet of the Netherlands
- Date formed: 3 September 1940
- Date dissolved: 27 July 1941 (Demissionary from 12 June 1941)

People and organisations
- Head of state: Queen Wilhelmina
- Head of government: Pieter Sjoerds Gerbrandy
- Deputy head of government: Hendrik van Boeijen (De Facto)
- No. of ministers: 10
- Ministers removed: 2
- Member party: Roman Catholic; State Party (RKSP); Social Democratic; Workers' Party (SDAP); Anti-Revolutionary Party (ARP); Christian Historical Union (CHU); Free-thinking; Democratic League (VDB); Liberal State Party (LSP)
- Status in legislature: National unity government War cabinet

History
- Incoming formation: 1940 Dutch cabinet formation
- Legislature terms: 1937–1945
- Predecessor: Second De Geer cabinet
- Successor: Second Gerbrandy cabinet

The First Gerbrandy cabinet, also called the Second London cabinet was the executive branch of the Dutch government-in-exile from 3 September 1940 until 27 July 1941. The War cabinet was formed by the Christian-democratic Roman Catholic State Party (RKSP), Anti-Revolutionary Party (ARP) and Christian Historical Union (CHU), the social-democratic Social Democratic Workers' Party (SDAP), the social-liberal Free-thinking Democratic League (VBD) and the conservative-liberal Liberal State Party (LSP) after the resignation of the previous Cabinet De Geer II. The national unity government (War cabinet) was the second of four war cabinets of the government-in-exile in London during World War II.

== Formation ==
On 26 August 1940 Queen Wilhelmina dismissed the Second De Geer cabinet after she lost confidence in the ability of Prime Minister Dirk Jan de Geer to govern after the German Invasion on 10 May 1940. Subsequently on 28 August 1940 Queen Wilhelmina appointed Minister of Justice Pieter Sjoerds Gerbrandy (ARP) as formateur to form a new cabinet. On 3 September 1940 the formation of the war cabinet was completed and Pieter Sjoerds Gerbrandy was installed as Prime Minister. All ministers of the previous Second De Geer cabinet (excluding Prime Minister Dirk Jan de Geer) where retained, with Minister of Colonial Affairs Charles Welter (RKSP) taking over as Minister of Finance from Dirk Jan de Geer.

== Term ==
The cabinet fell after a conflict between Queen Wilhelmina and Minister of Defence Adriaan Dijxhoorn, leading to the dismissal of the minister. On 1 July 1941, the other ministers resigned and the cabinet continued for five weeks as a demissionary cabinet until the ministries were redistributed and the Second Gerbrandy cabinet was installed on 27 July 1941.

=== Changes ===
On 1 May 1941 Minister of Agriculture and Fisheries Aat van Rhijn (CHU) was appointed as a Member of the Court of Audits. Because there was little work in the Ministry of Agriculture and Fisheries while the government-in-exile was in London the portfolio was combined with the Minister of Commerce, Industry and Shipping Max Steenberghe (RKSP).

== Cabinet members ==
Ministers		Title/Ministry/Portfolio(s)		Begin	End	Party
Pieter Sjoerds Gerbrandy	Pieter Sjoerds Gerbrandy	Prime Minister		3 September 1940	27 July 1941^{[Continued]}	Anti-Revolutionary; Party
Pieter Sjoerds Gerbrandy	Pieter Sjoerds Gerbrandy	Minister	Justice	3 September 1940^{[Retained]}	27 July 1941^{[Continued]}	Anti-Revolutionary; Party
Hendrik van Boeijen	Hendrik van Boeijen	Minister	General Affairs	3 September 1940^{[Retained]}	27 July 1941^{[Continued]}	Christian; Historical Union
Hendrik van Boeijen	Hendrik van Boeijen	Minister	Interior	3 September 1940^{[Retained]}	27 July 1941^{[Continued]}	Christian; Historical Union
Eelco van Kleffens	Eelco van Kleffens	Minister	Foreign Affairs	3 September 1940^{[Retained]}	27 July 1941^{[Continued]}	Independent; Classical Liberal
Charles Welter	Charles Welter	Minister	Finance	3 September 1940	27 July 1941	Roman Catholic; State Party
Charles Welter	Charles Welter	Minister	Colonial Affairs	3 September 1940^{[Retained]}	17 November 1941^{[Continued]}	Roman Catholic; State Party
Max Steenberghe	Max Steenberghe	Minister	Commerce, Industry and Shipping	3 September 1940^{[Retained]}	17 November 1941^{[Continued]}	Roman Catholic; State Party
Adriaan Dijxhoorn	Adriaan Dijxhoorn	Minister	Defence	3 September 1940^{[Retained]}	12 June 1941^{[Res]}	Independent; Conservative Liberal
Hendrik van Boeijen	Hendrik van Boeijen	Minister	Defence	12 June 1941	27 July 1941^{[Continued]}	Christian; Historical Union
Jan van den Tempel	Dr. Jan van den Tempel (1877–1955)	Minister	Social Affairs	3 September 1940^{[Retained]}	27 July 1941^{[Continued]}	Social Democratic; Workers' Party
Gerrit Bolkestein	Gerrit Bolkestein	Minister	Education, Arts and Sciences	3 September 1940^{[Retained]}	27 July 1941^{[Continued]}	Free-thinking; Democratic League
Willem Albarda	Willem Albarda	Minister	Water Management	3 September 1940^{[Retained]}	27 July 1941^{[Continued]}	Social Democratic; Workers' Party
Aat van Rhijn	Aat van Rhijn	Minister	Agriculture and Fisheries	3 September 1940^{[Retained]}	1 May 1941^{[App]}	Christian; Historical Union
Max Steenberghe	Max Steenberghe	Minister	Agriculture and Fisheries	1 May 1941	27 July 1941^{[Continued]}	Roman Catholic; State Party

^{Resigned}
^{Retained from the previous cabinet}
^{Continued in the next cabinet}
^{Appointed as President of the Court of Audit}
