= 1948 Dutch general election =

- 7 July 1948
- All 100 seats in the House of Representatives; 51 seats needed for a majority
- Turnout: 93.67% (▲0.57pp)
Party	Leader	Vote %	Seats	+/–
KVP	Carl Romme	31.04	32	0
PvdA	Willem Drees	25.60	27	−2
ARP	Jan Schouten	13.21	13	0
CHU	Hendrik Tilanus	9.19	9	+1
VVD	Pieter Oud	7.95	8	+2
CPN	Paul de Groot	7.74	8	−2
SGP	Pieter Zandt	2.37	2	0
KNP	Charles Welter	1.26	1	New
This lists parties that won seats. See the complete results below.
Most voted-for party by municipality
Cabinet before	Cabinet after
First Beel cabinet KVP–PvdA	Drees–Van Schaik cabinet KVP–PvdA–CHU–VVD

General elections were held in the Netherlands on 7 July 1948. The Catholic People's Party remained the largest party in the House of Representatives, winning 32 of the 100 seats.

Following the elections, a broad four-party coalition government was formed between the Catholic People's Party, Labour Party, Christian Historical Union and People's Party for Freedom and Democracy. Combined these parties held 76% of the available seats in parliament.

== Results ==
Party	Votes	%	Seats	+/–
Catholic People's Party	1,531,154	31.04	32	0
Labour Party	1,263,058	25.60	27	–2
Anti-Revolutionary Party	651,612	13.21	13	0
Christian Historical Union	453,226	9.19	9	+1
People's Party for Freedom and Democracy	391,925	7.95	8	+2
Communist Party of the Netherlands	382,001	7.74	8	–2
Reformed Political Party	116,937	2.37	2	0
Catholic National Party	62,376	1.26	1	New
Middle Class Party	40,949	0.83	0	New
Independent National Group	22,175	0.45	0	New
Old SDAP/Progressive Party for World Government	15,322	0.31	0	New
Revolutionary Communist Party	2,224	0.05	0	New
Total	4,932,959	100.00	100	0
Valid votes	4,932,959	96.92		
Invalid/blank votes	156,623	3.08		
Total votes	5,089,582	100.00		
Registered voters/turnout	5,433,663	93.67		
Source: Nederlandse verkiezingsuitslagen

=== By province ===
Results by province
Province	KVP	PvdA	ARP	CHU	VVD	CPN	SGP	KNP	Others
Drenthe	6.2	38.0	19.0	13.8	15.7	5.4	0.4	0.2	1.3
Friesland	7.0	33.2	24.3	17.6	7.3	7.1	0.7	0.1	2.6
Gelderland	31.4	24.9	12.0	13.9	8.2	3.1	4.2	1.1	1.1
Groningen	5.6	33.3	22.9	11.4	12.0	11.3	0.2	0.4	2.9
Limburg	81.5	8.6	1.0	0.7	0.8	3.7	0.1	3.0	0.7
North Brabant	77.2	10.5	3.3	2.6	1.6	1.7	0.7	1.8	0.5
North Holland	23.4	29.2	11.2	5.4	9.8	17.3	0.6	1.1	2.0
Overijssel	27.3	25.3	13.5	14.1	8.3	7.6	2.9	0.4	0.6
South Holland	18.3	30.7	16.7	10.1	9.7	7.3	3.9	1.3	2.1
Southern IJsselmeer Polders	22.0	26.4	18.3	10.8	3.2	16.9	1.9	0.2	0.4
Utrecht	24.7	25.1	18.7	11.1	7.6	4.8	3.9	1.8	2.1
Zeeland	19.4	24.4	16.5	16.8	8.0	1.7	9.9	1.2	2.1
