= Willem Albarda =

Dutch politician (1877–1957)

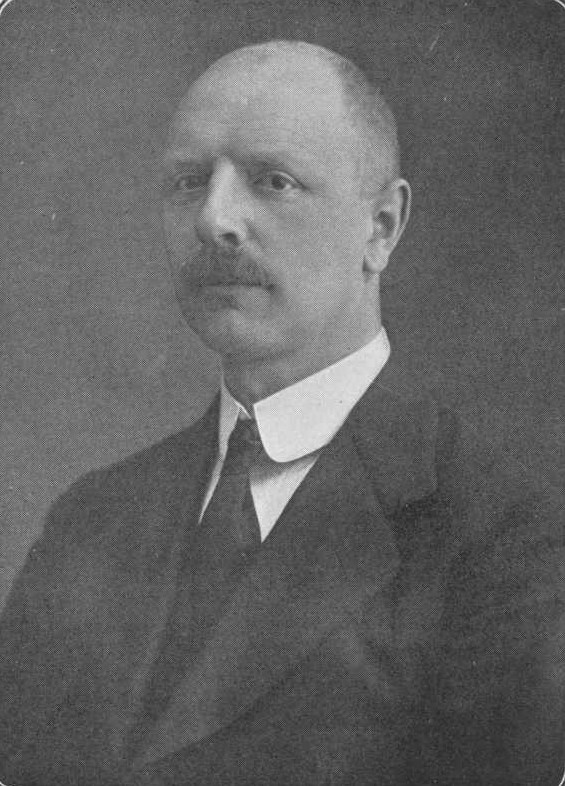
- Albarda in 1911

Member of the Council of State
- In office 28 August 1945 – 1 July 1952
- Vice President: Frans Beelaerts van Blokland

Minister of Finance
- In office 17 November 1941 – 9 December 1942
- Prime Minister: Pieter Sjoerds Gerbrandy
- Preceded by: Max Steenberghe
- Succeeded by: Johannes van den Broek

Minister of Water Management
- In office 10 August 1939 – 23 February 1945
- Prime Minister: Dirk Jan de Geer (1939–1940); Pieter Sjoerds Gerbrandy (1940–1945)
- Preceded by: Otto van Lidth de Jeude
- Succeeded by: Frans Wijffels (Ad interim)

Parliamentary leader in the House of Representatives
- In office 15 September 1925 – 10 August 1939
- Preceded by: Jan Schaper
- Succeeded by: Willem Drees

Leader of the Social Democratic Workers' Party
- In office 12 July 1925 – 14 May 1940
- Deputy: See list: Jan Schaper (1925–1934) Jan van den Tempel (1934–1940) Willem Drees (1939–1940)
- Preceded by: Pieter Jelles Troelstra
- Succeeded by: Willem Drees

Member of the House of Representatives
- In office 16 September 1913 – 10 August 1939
- Constituency: Enschede (until 1918)

Personal details
- Born: Johan Willem Albarda; 5 June 1877 Leeuwarden, Netherlands
- Died: 19 April 1957 (aged 79) The Hague, Netherlands
- Party: Labour Party (from 1946)
- Other political affiliations: Social Democratic Workers' Party (1899–1946)
- Spouse(s): Anna Brals (m. 1903; died 1929) Hiltje Ebkje Tibo (m. 1931)
- Children: 1 son and 1 daughter (first marriage)
- Education: Delft Polytechnic School (Bachelor of Engineering, Master of Engineering)
- Occupation: Politician; civil servant; civil engineer; researcher; teacher; social worker; editor; author
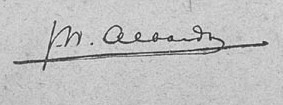
- Signature

Johan Willem Albarda (5 June 1877 – 19 April 1957) was a Dutch politician of the defunct Social Democratic Workers' Party (SDAP) and later co-founder of the Labour Party (PvdA) and civil engineer.

== Biography ==
Albarda worked as student researcher at the Delft Polytechnic School from May 1896 until July 1903 and also as editor-in-chief of the student newspaper Studenten-Weekblad from April 1898 until July 1903. Albarda worked as a math teacher from August 1903 until September 1911 in Almelo from August 1903 until February 1905 and in The Hague from February 1905 until November 1911 and as a civil servant for municipality of Amsterdam as director of the Social Service from November 1911 until September 1913. Albarda was elected as a Member of the House of Representatives after the election of 1913, taking office on 16 September 1913. After the Leader of the Social Democratic Workers' Party and parliamentary leader of the Social Democratic Workers' Party in the House of Representatives Pieter Jelles Troelstra announced his retirement from national politics and that he would not stand for the election of 1925 Albarda was selected as his successor as leader on 12 July 1925 and became parliamentary leader in the House of Representatives on 15 September 1925.

On 27 July 1939, the fifth Colijn cabinet was dismissed by Queen Wilhelmina and continued to serve in a demissionary capacity until it was replaced by the second De Geer cabinet with Albarda appointed as Minister of Water Management, taking office on 10 August 1939. On 10 May 1940, Nazi Germany invaded the Netherlands and the government fled to London to escape the German occupation. On 14 May 1940, Albarda announced that he was stepping down as party leader in favor of parliamentary leader in the House of Representatives Willem Drees. The second De Geer cabinet fell on 26 August 1940 after a conflict between Queen Wilhelmina and Prime Minister Dirk Jan de Geer and continued to serve in a demissionary capacity until it was replaced by the first Gerbrandy cabinet with Albarda continuing as of Minister of Water Management, taking office on 3 September 1940. The first Gerbrandy cabinet fell on 12 June 1941 after a conflict between Queen Wilhelmina and Minister of Defence Adriaan Dijxhoorn and continued to serve in a demissionary capacity until it was replaced by the second Gerbrandy cabinet with Albarda continuing as of Minister of Water Management, taking office on 27 July 1941. Albarda was appointed as Minister of Finance following the resignation of Max Steenberghe and dual served in both positions, taking office on 17 November 1941. On 9 December 1942, Albarda resigned as Minister of Finance following the appointment of Johannes van den Broek but continued as Minister of Water Management. On 27 January 1945, Prime Minister Pieter Sjoerds Gerbrandy forced Minister of the Interior Jaap Burger to resign following an impromptu remark during a radio address where Burger differentiated between "wrongful" Dutch civilians (foute Nederlanders) and Dutch civilians who made a mistake (Nederlanders die een fout hebben gemaakt) but because Prime Minister Gerbrandy did not discuss this with rest of the cabinet, all the Social Democratic Workers' Party cabinet members announced their resignation and the cabinet continued to serve in a demissionary capacity until it was replaced by the third Gerbrandy cabinet on 23 February 1945.

Following the end of World War II Albarda remained active in politics. In August 1945, he was nominated as a Member of the Council of State, serving from 28 August 1945 until 1 July 1952. The Albardastraat in The Hague is named after him.

== Decorations ==
Honours
Ribbon bar	Honour	Country	Date	Comment
	Knight of the Order of the Netherlands Lion	Netherlands	31 Augustus 1945	
	Commander of the Order of the Oak Crown	Luxembourg	12 April 1946	
	Grand Officer of the Order of the Crown	Belgium	17 February 1947	
	Commander of the Order of Orange-Nassau	Netherlands	1 July 1952	Elevated from Officer (16 September 1923)

House of Representatives of the Netherlands
Preceded by Gerrit Elhorst	Member for Enschede; 1913–1918	District abolished
Party political offices
Preceded by Pieter Jelles Troelstra	Leader of the Social; Democratic Workers' Party; 1925–1940	Succeeded by Willem Drees
Preceded by Jan Schaper	Parliamentary leader of the Social Democratic Workers' Party in the House of Representatives; 1925–1939	Succeeded by Willem Drees
Political offices
Preceded by Otto van Lidth de Jeude	Minister of Water Management; 1939–1945	Succeeded by Frans Wijffels; Ad interim
Preceded by Max Steenberghe	Minister of Finance; 1941–1942	Succeeded by Johannes van den Broek
