= Catholic National Party =

Political party in the Netherlands (1948–1955)

The Catholic National Party (in Dutch: Katholieke Nationale Partij, KNP) was a Dutch conservative Catholic political party. The KNP served as a Catholic protest party against Indonesian independence.

== Party History ==
The KNP was founded on December 11, 1948 as a continuation of the list-Welter (Committee for Action). This list got one seat in the 1948 election. It was led by Charles Welter, a former Dutch Minister for Colonial Affairs, who rejected the Dutch government's support for Indonesian independence. It also turned against the cooperation of the Catholic People's Party (KVP) with the Labour Party.

In the 1952 election, the party won another seat. In 1955, the bishops pressured the KNP to return to the KVP. Welter joined the KVP parliamentary party. In the 1956 and 1959 elections, Welter got a seat for the KVP.

== Ideology and issues ==
The KNP was a Catholic party, which advocated christian-democratic politics. The party was conservative in economic and ethical matters.

The most important issue for the KNP was the unity of the Dutch empire. It rejected the independence of the Dutch Indies and it instead wanted to form a kingdom in which the Netherlands and Indonesia were equal partners. In 1950, the independence of Indonesia was irreversible, and the party oriented towards other issues. It became an advocate for the interests of the Papuas, Ambonese people and Dutch citizens for the Netherlands. The two Protestant parties, ARP and CHU, were also divided on the issue of Indonesian independence, with the CHU cooperating in the Dutch cabinet and the ARP rejecting Indonesian independence.

It also sought to limit government interference in society and reduce government spending. It, however, advocated increased support for the agricultural and shipbuilding sectors.

== Representation ==
This table shows the KNP's results in elections to the House of Representatives and Senate, as well as the party's political leadership: the fractievoorzitter, is the chair of the parliamentary party and the lijsttrekker is the party's top candidate in the general election, these posts are normally taken by the party's leader.

Year	HoR	S	Lijsttrekker	Fractievoorzitter
1948	1	0	Charles Welter	Charles Welter
1949	1	0	no elections	Charles Welter
1950	1	0	no elections	Charles Welter
1951	1	0	no elections	Charles Welter
1952	2	0	Charles Welter	Charles Welter
1953	2	0	no elections	Charles Welter
1954	2	0	no elections	Charles Welter

== Electorate ==
The support of the KNP was spread throughout the country. The party's support peaked in the Hague were many former civil servants from the Dutch Indies and was weaker in the three Northern provinces.
