= Charles Welter =

Dutch politician and diplomat

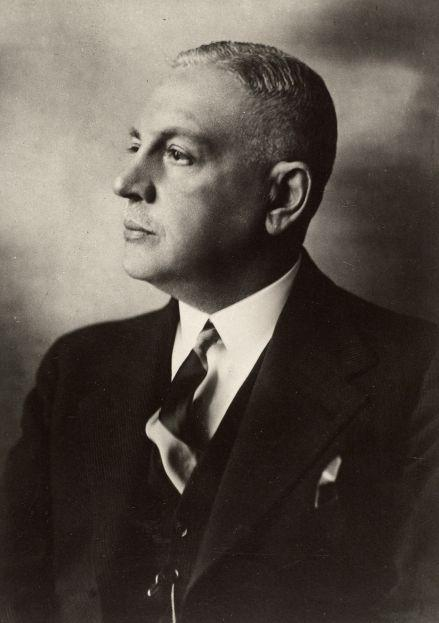
- Charles Welter in 1926

Parliamentary leader in the House of Representatives
- In office 27 July 1948 – 28 May 1956
- Preceded by: Office established
- Succeeded by: Office discontinued
- Parliamentary group: Catholic National Party

Leader and chairman of the Catholic National Party
- In office 11 December 1948 – 28 May 1956
- Preceded by: Office established
- Succeeded by: Office discontinued

Member of the Senate
- In office 20 November 1945 – 24 July 1946

Minister of Finance
- In office 3 September 1940 – 27 July 1941
- Prime Minister: Pieter Sjoerds Gerbrandy
- Preceded by: Dirk Jan de Geer
- Succeeded by: Max Steenberghe

Member of the House of Representatives
- In office 27 July 1948 – 5 June 1963
- In office 8 June 1937 – 28 June 1937

Minister of Colonial Affairs
- In office 10 August 1939 – 17 November 1941
- Prime Minister: Dirk Jan de Geer (1939–1940); Pieter Sjoerds Gerbrandy (1940–1941)
- Preceded by: Cornelis van den Bussche
- Succeeded by: Pieter Sjoerds Gerbrandy
- In office 24 June 1937 – 25 July 1939
- Prime Minister: Hendrikus Colijn
- Preceded by: Hendrikus Colijn
- Succeeded by: Cornelis van den Bussche
- In office 1 October 1925 – 8 March 1926
- Prime Minister: Hendrikus Colijn
- Preceded by: Hendrikus Colijn (ad interim)
- Succeeded by: Jacob Koningsberger

Personal details
- Born: Charles Joseph Ignace Marie Welter; 6 April 1880 The Hague, Netherlands
- Died: 28 March 1972 (aged 91) The Hague, Netherlands
- Party: Catholic People's Party (from 1956)
- Other political affiliations: Catholic National Party (1948–1956); Catholic People's Party (1945–1947); Roman Catholic State Party (1926–1945); General League (until 1926)
- Spouse: Geertruida Burger (m. 1921)
- Children: 4 daughters and 2 sons
- Education: Delft Polytechnic School (Bachelor of Letters)

Charles Joseph Ignace Marie Welter (6 April 1880 – 28 March 1972) was a Dutch politician and diplomat of the General League of Roman Catholic Caucuses, later the Roman Catholic State Party (RKSP), the Catholic People's Party (KVP) and founder of Catholic National Party (KNP) before rejoining the Catholic People's Party and nonprofit director.

== Biography ==
Welter worked as a civil servant for the Ministry of the Interior from July 1901 until October 1902 and for the Ministry of Colonial Affairs in the Kedu Residency and Pekalongan in the Dutch East Indies from October 1902 until April 1908 and in Batavia from April 1908 until May 1911. Welter moved back to the Netherlands and worked for the Ministry of Colonial Affairs in The Hague from May 1911 until November 1915 and returned to the Dutch East Indies working for the Ministry of Colonial Affairs in Batavia from November 1915 until October 1925.

After the 1925 general election, Welter was appointed Minister of Colonial Affairs in the first Colijn cabinet, taking office on 1 October 1925. The cabinet fell just three months later on 11 November 1925 and continued to serve in a demissionary capacity until the cabinet formation of 1926 resulted in the formation of the first De Geer cabinet on 8 March 1926, in which Welters was not given a cabinet post. In March 1926 Welters was nominated as a member of the Council of the Indies, serving from 30 March 1926 until 30 March 1931. Welter semi-retired from active politic and became active in the public sector served on several state commissions and councils on behalf of the government (Cadastre Agency, Statistics Netherlands and the Welter Commission) and as a diplomat and lobbyist for several economic delegations on behalf of the government. Welter was elected to the House of Representatives in the 1937 general election, taking office on 8 June 1937. Following the cabinet formation of 1937 Welter returned to his position as Minister of Colonial Affairs in the fourth Colijn cabinet, taking office on 24 June 1937. The cabinet fell on 29 June 1939 and continued to serve in a demissionary capacity until the first cabinet formation of 1939, with Welters not given a cabinet post in the new fifth Colijn cabinet, which took office on 25 July 1939. On 25 July 1939, just three days later, the cabinet was dismissed by Queen Wilhelmina and continued to serve in a demissionary capacity until the second cabinet formation of 1939 when it was replaced by the second De Geer cabinet with Welter appointed as Minister of Colonial Affairs again, taking office on 10 August 1939.

Upon the German invasion of the Netherlands on 10 May 1940, the government fled to London to escape the German occupation. The second De Geer cabinet fell on 26 August 1940 after a conflict between Queen Wilhelmina and Prime Minister Dirk Jan de Geer and continued to serve in a demissionary capacity until the cabinet formation of 1940, when it was replaced by the first Gerbrandy cabinet, with Welter continuing as Minister of Colonial Affairs and appointed as Minister of Finance, dual serving in both positions, taking office on 3 September 1940. The cabinet fell on 12 June 1941 after a conflict between Queen Wilhelmina and Minister of Defence Adriaan Dijxhoorn and continued to serve in a demissionary capacity until the cabinet formation of 1941 when it was replaced by the second Gerbrandy cabinet, with Welter continuing as of Minister of Colonial Affairs, taking office on 27 July 1941. On 17 November 1941 Welter and Minister of Finance and Minister of Commerce, Industry and Shipping Max Steenberghe resigned after disagreeing with the cabinet's war policies.

Returning to the Netherlands in 1945, Welter was appointed to the Senate for the newly founded Catholic People's Party. In March 1946, he was a member of the parliamentary committee of inquiry into the policy of the Dutch East Indies government. He disagreed strongly with the government policy on the Dutch Indies, as well as his party's cooperation with the Labour Party.

From the beginning of 1947, the Provisional Catholic Committee of Action acted within the KVP against the Indonesian policy of the Roman/Red coalition. In 1948, this committee took part in the general election with a separate Welter list, winning a single seat. On 11 December 1948 the Catholic National Party (KNP) was established. Welter, who occupied the only seat in parliament, also became the first general chairman of the KNP.

After the transfer of sovereignty to Indonesia, this KNP initially seemed to still have a reason to exist, especially as a right-wing opposition party, not only with regard to the lasting problems in relations with Indonesia, but also in opposition to the trade union influence within the Catholic People's Party. In 1952, the KNP won 2.7% of the vote and two seats in the House of Representatives. On 29 October 1955, under pressure from the bishops, the KNP merged back into the Catholic People's Party. When the Drees cabinet fell at the end of 1958, Welter's last complaint against the KVP also disappeared, because years of cooperation with the social democrats came to an end.

Welter remained as a Member of Parliament for the KVP from 1956 to 1963.

== Decorations ==
Honours
Ribbon bar	Honour	Country	Date	Comment
	Knight of the Order of the Netherlands Lion	Netherlands	13 August 1923	
	Grand Officer of the Order of Oranje-Nassau	Netherlands	16 May 1933	

Party political offices
New political party	Leader and chairman of the Catholic National Party; 1948–1956	Party disestablished
New political party	Parliamentary leader of the Catholic National Party in the House of Representatives; 1948–1956	Party disestablished
Political offices
Preceded by Hendrikus Colijn; Ad interim	Minister of Colonial Affairs; 1925–1926; 1937–1939; 1939–1941	Succeeded by Jacob Koningsberger
Preceded by Hendrikus Colijn	Minister of Colonial Affairs; 1925–1926; 1937–1939; 1939–1941	Succeeded by Cornelis van den Bussche
Preceded by Cornelis van den Bussche	Minister of Colonial Affairs; 1925–1926; 1937–1939; 1939–1941	Succeeded by Pieter Sjoerds Gerbrandy
Preceded by Dirk Jan de Geer	Minister of Finance; 1940–1941	Succeeded by Max Steenberghe
Records
Preceded by Simon de Vries	Oldest living former cabinet member 27 September 1961 – 28 March 1972	Succeeded by Laurentius Nicolaas; Deckers
