= Dutch Bellamy Party =

Defunct political party in the Netherlands

Dutch Bellamy Party Nederlandse Bellamy-Partij
- Abbreviation: NBP
- Chairperson: J. Derksen Staats
- Founded: 30 May 1945
- Dissolved: c. April 1947
- Succeeded by: Progressive Party for a World Government (de facto)
- Headquarters: Groningen
- Ideology: Utopian socialism
- Political position: Left-wing

The Dutch Bellamy Party (Dutch: Nederlandse Bellamy-Partij, NBP) was a political party in the Netherlands that upheld the thoughts of the American utopian socialist Edward Bellamy.

The Bellamy movement emerged in the Netherlands in 1927, and in 1933 the International Bellamy Association (IVB) was founded in Rotterdam. By the end of the 1930s the IVB had around 10,000 followers. The IVB did, however, not involve itself in party politics.

During World War II, the German occupation authorities banned the IVB. During this period, a section of the movement felt a need to involve the ideals of Bellamy in party politics. On May 30, 1945, just a few weeks after the end of the occupation the NBP was founded by a group of six IVB leaders in Groningen. The chairman of the party was J. Derksen Staats. The IVB, which was reorganized after the war, did not actively support the idea of a political party.

The NBP contested the 1946 parliamentary election, with L.B. van den Muyzenberg as its top candidate. The party contested elections with the slogan of "gradual yet consequent socialization of the means of production". The party got 11,025 votes (0.23%), about half of them in Rotterdam and The Hague. It got 1.04% of The Hague votes, 0.86% in Rotterdam, 0.72% in Haarlem, 0.52% in Groningen, 0.52% in Den Helder and 0.38% in Arnhem. The party did not win any seat in the parliament.

After the elections, the NBP entered into a period of decline. In April 1947 Van den Muyzenberg and the majority of the NBP members left to join the Progressive Party for a World Government. The NBP ceased to exist shortly thereafter.
