= Carl Romme =

Dutch lawyer, jurist and politician

His Excellency Carl Romme
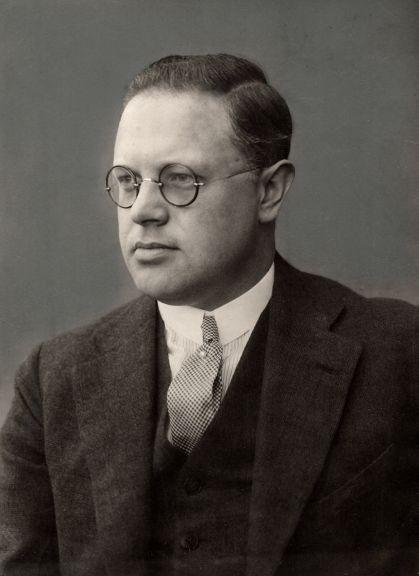
- Romme in 1938

Member of the Council of State
- In office 1 May 1962 – 1 January 1972
- Vice President: Louis Beel

Parliamentary leader in the House of Representatives
- In office 20 May 1946 – 17 February 1961
- Preceded by: Frans Teulings
- Succeeded by: Jan Andriessen
- Parliamentary group: Catholic People's Party

Leader of the Catholic People's Party
- In office 20 May 1946 – 17 February 1961
- Preceded by: Office established
- Succeeded by: Wim de Kort

Minister of Social Affairs
- In office 24 June 1937 – 25 July 1939
- Prime Minister: Hendrikus Colijn
- Preceded by: Marcus Slingenberg
- Succeeded by: Marinus Damme

Member of the Senate
- In office 8 June 1937 – 24 June 1937

Member of the House of Representatives
- In office 4 June 1946 – 18 February 1961
- In office 31 January 1933 – 9 May 1933

Personal details
- Born: Carl Paul Maria Romme; 21 December 1896 Oirschot, Netherlands
- Died: 16 October 1980 (aged 83) Tilburg, Netherlands
- Party: Christian Democratic Appeal (from 1980)
- Other political affiliations: Catholic People's Party (1945–1980); Roman Catholic State Party (1926–1945); General League (1918– 1926)
- Education: University of Amsterdam (Bachelor of Laws, Master of Laws)
- Occupation: Politician · civil servant · Jurist · Lawyer · Researcher · Businessman · Corporate director · Nonprofit director · Trade association executive · Academic administrator · Political pundit · Editor · Columnist · Author · professor

Carl Paul Maria Romme (21 December 1896 – 16 October 1980) was a Dutch politician of the Roman Catholic State Party (RKSP) and later co-founder of the Catholic People's Party (KVP) and jurist. He was granted the honorary title of Minister of State on 16 December 1971.

== Biography ==
Romme attended the Amsterdams Lyceum from June 1909 until June 1914 and applied at the University of Amsterdam in June 1914 majoring in Law and obtaining a Bachelor of Laws degree before graduating with a Master of Laws degree in July 1919. Romme worked as a lawyer in Amsterdam from September 1919 until June 1937. Romme also worked as a trade association executive for the Catholic Employers' Association from November 1919 until December 1924 and was a contributing editor for the magazines Het Patroonsblad and De RK Werkgever from February 1920 until December 1924. Romme served on the municipal council of Amsterdam from April 1921 until June 1937 and served on the Provincial Council of North Holland from June 1935 until June 1937. Romme also became active in the private sector and public sector and occupied numerous seats as a corporate director and nonprofit director on several boards of directors and supervisory boards (Brill Publishers, Elsevier and the Concertgebouw) and served on several state commissions and councils on behalf of the government (Mine Council and the Council for Culture). Romme also worked as an associate professor of labour law at Tilburg University from 1 January 1933 until 1 January 1935 and as a distinguished professor of Labour law, administrative law and constitutional law and at Tilburg University from 1 January 1935 until 24 June 1937.

Romme became a member of the House of Representatives after the resignation of Leo Guit, serving from 31 January 1933 until 9 May 1933. Romme was elected to the Senate after the 1937 Senate election, taking office on 8 June 1937. After the 1937 general election, Romme was appointed as Minister of Social Affairs in the fourth Colijn cabinet, taking office on 24 June 1937. This cabinet fell on 29 June 1939 and continued to serve in a demissionary capacity until 1939, when it was replaced by the fifth Colijn cabinet on 25 July 1939.

Romme again worked as a lawyer in Amsterdam from January 1940 until June 1946. During the German invasion of the Netherlands on 10 May 1940, the government fled to London to escape German occupation. During World War II Romme continued to work as a lawyer. In December 1941 Romme was arrested and detained in Amsterdam and was released in January 1942. On 4 May 1942 Romme was arrested again and detained in Kamp Sint-Michielsgestel but was released four days later on 7 May 1942. Following the end of World War II, Romme became actively involved in politics again, and was one of the primary initiators for reforming the Roman Catholic State Party. On 22 December 1945 the party was renamed as the Catholic People's Party, and as one of its co-founders, Romme was selected as the first Leader of the Catholic People's Party and the lead candidate of the party for the 1946 general election on 10 January 1946. The Catholic People's Party had 31 seats in the House of House of Representatives previously held by the Roman Catholic State Party and won slightly, gaining one seat. It remained the largest party and now had 32 seats in the House of Representatives. Romme was elected again to the House of Representatives and became his party's parliamentary leader in the House on 4 June 1946. Romme served continuously as party leader and parliamentary leader for the next 15 years and was lead candidate for the 1948, 1952, 1956 and 1959 general elections.

== Decorations ==
Honours
Ribbon bar	Honour	Country	Date	Comment
	Grand Officer of the Order of the Crown	Belgium	18 February 1938	
	Knight Grand Cross of the Order of the House of Orange	Netherlands	22 August 1946	
	Knight Commander with Star of the Order of the Holy Sepulchre	Holy See	10 December 1946	
	Grand Officer of the Order of the Oak Crown	Luxembourg	12 June 1948	
	Grand Officer of the Legion of Honour	France	6 February 1952	
	Knight Commander with Star of the Order of St. Gregory the Great	Holy See	8 March 1957	
	Grand Cross 1st Class of the Order of Merit	West Germany	29 April 1959	
	Grand Officer of the Order of Orange-Nassau	Netherlands	18 February 1961	Elevated from Commander (30 April 1956)
	Commander of the Order of the Netherlands Lion	Netherlands	16 December 1971	Elevated from Knight (30 July 1939)

Honorific titles
Ribbon bar	Honour	Country	Date	Comment
	Minister of State	Netherlands	16 December 1971	Style of Excellency

== Honorary degrees ==
Honorary degrees
University	Field	Country	Date	Comment
Tilburg University	Law	Netherlands	21 November 1962	Style of Doctor

Party political offices
New political party	Leader of the Catholic People's Party; 1946–1961	Succeeded by Wim de Kort
New political party	Lead candidate of the Catholic People's Party; 1946, 1948, 1952, 1956, 1959	Succeeded by Wim de Kort; 1963
Preceded by Frans Teulings	Parliamentary leader of the Catholic People's Party in the House of Representatives; 1946–1961	Succeeded by Jan Andriessen
Political offices
Preceded by Marcus Slingenberg	Minister of Social Affairs; 1937–1939	Succeeded by Marinus Damme
