= Frans Wijffels =

Dutch politician (1899–1968)

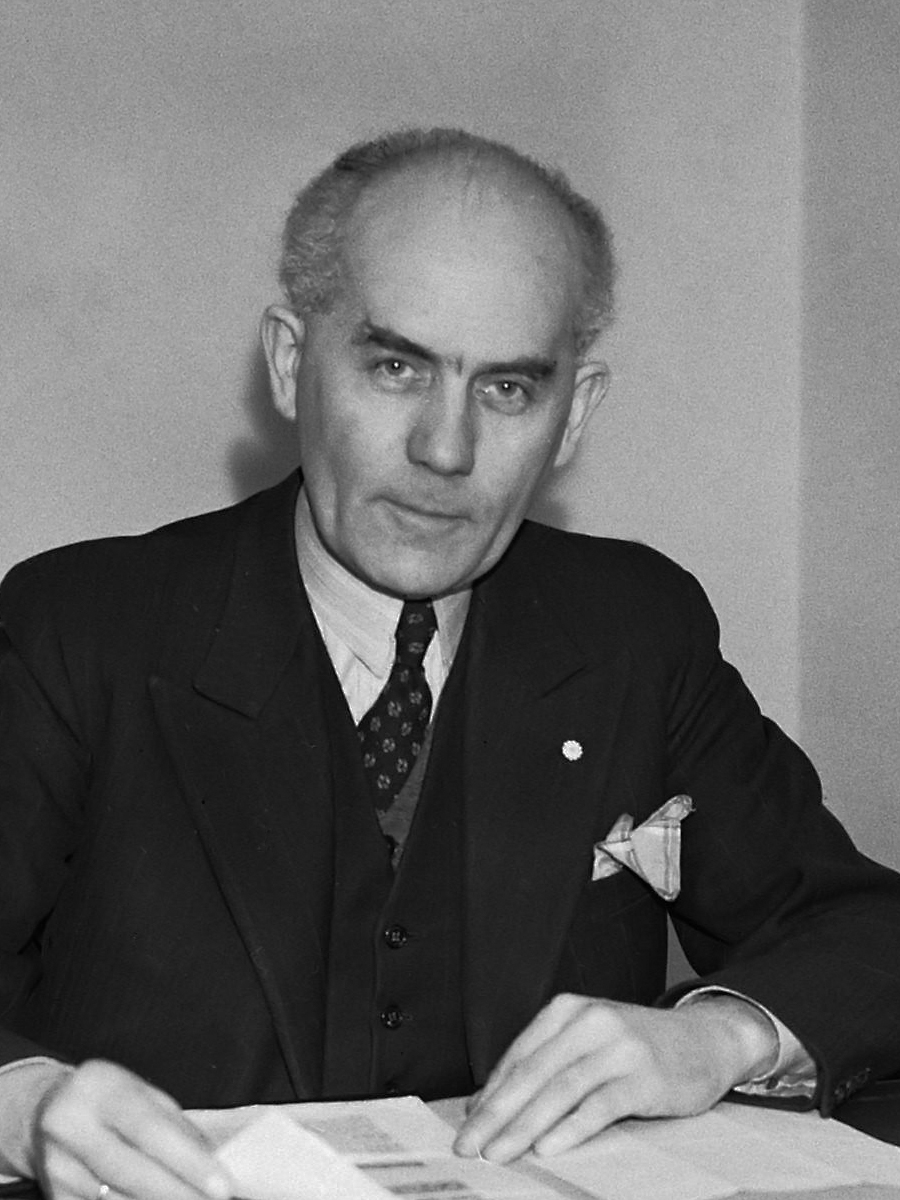
Frans Wijffels (1945)

Franciscus Cornelis Marie (Frans) Wijffels (10 April 1899, Stratum – 22 March 1968, Delft) was a Dutch politician of the Roman Catholic State Party (RKSP) and its successor the Catholic People's Party (KVP).

Wijffels was Minister of Social Affairs in the third Gerbrandy cabinet and also a member of the House of Representatives and the Senate.
