= 1946 Dutch general election =

- 17 May 1946
- All 100 seats in the House of Representatives; 51 seats needed for a majority
- Turnout: 93.10% (▼1.30pp)
Party	Leader	Vote %	Seats	+/–
KVP	Carl Romme	30.81	32	+1
PvdA	Willem Drees	28.31	29	−2
ARP	Jan Schouten	12.90	13	−4
CPN	Paul de Groot	10.56	10	+7
CHU	Hendrik Tilanus	7.84	8	0
PvdV	Dirk Stikker	6.41	6	+2
SGP	Pieter Zandt	2.14	2	0
This lists parties that won seats. See the complete results below.
Most voted-for party by municipality
Cabinet before	Cabinet after
Schermerhorn–Drees cabinet KVP–PvdA–ARP	First Beel cabinet KVP–PvdA

General elections were held in the Netherlands on 17 May 1946, the first after World War II. The Catholic People's Party, a continuation of the pre-war Roman Catholic State Party, remained the largest party in the House of Representatives, winning 32 of the 100 seats.

Following the elections, the Catholic People's Party formed a grand coalition government with the Labour Party.

== Results ==
Indicated changes in seats are compared to the Schermerhorn-Drees cabinet appointed by Queen Wilhelmina after World War II.

Party	Votes	%	Seats	+/–
Catholic People's Party	1,466,582	30.81	32	+1
Labour Party	1,347,940	28.31	29	–1
Anti-Revolutionary Party	614,201	12.90	13	–4
Communist Party of the Netherlands	502,963	10.56	10	+7
Christian Historical Union	373,217	7.84	8	0
Freedom Party	305,287	6.41	6	+2
Reformed Political Party	101,759	2.14	2	0
Protestant Union	32,020	0.67	0	New
Dutch Bellamy Party	11,205	0.24	0	New
Lopes Group	5,537	0.12	0	New
Total	4,760,711	100.00	100	0
Valid votes	4,760,711	96.92		
Invalid/blank votes	151,304	3.08		
Total votes	4,912,015	100.00		
Registered voters/turnout	5,275,888	93.10		
Source: Nederlandse verkiezingsuitslagen

=== By province ===
Results by province
Province	KVP	PvdA	ARP	CPN	CHU	PvdV	SGP	Others
Drenthe	5.8	39.4	19.2	7.1	12.0	15.8	0.2	0.5
Friesland	6.7	37.5	23.8	10.1	15.6	4.7	0.7	0.9
Gelderland	31.6	28.3	12.0	4.5	13.0	6.4	3.5	0.7
Groningen	5.5	35.5	22.5	14.6	9.3	11.2	0.1	1.3
Limburg	79.6	12.5	0.9	5.6	0.5	0.6	0.2	-
North Brabant	77.7	12.5	3.3	2.2	2.3	1.1	0.6	0.3
North Holland	23.2	32.6	10.0	21.1	4.2	7.0	0.5	1.5
Overijssel	26.6	28.7	13.9	10.4	10.9	5.4	2.7	1.4
South Holland	18.6	31.9	16.6	11.3	8.2	8.5	3.6	1.3
Southern IJsselmeer Polders	23.4	28.8	17.2	18.3	7.4	2.0	1.6	1.4
Utrecht	25.8	29.1	17.3	7.6	9.6	6.2	3.5	1.0
Zeeland	20.9	24.6	16.3	2.8	17.3	7.2	9.8	1.2
