= Catholic People's Party =

Catholic People's Party Katholieke Volkspartij
- Abbreviation: KVP
- Founder: Carl Romme; Josef van Schaik; Laurent Deckers; Frans Teulings; Max Steenberghe; Jan de Quay; Louis Beel; Teun Struycken
- Founded: 22 December 1945; 80 years ago
- Dissolved: 27 September 1980; 46 years ago
- Preceded by: Roman Catholic State Party
- Merged into: Christian Democratic Appeal
- Headquarters: Mauritskade 25; The Hague
- Youth wing: KVPJO
- Think tank: Centrum voor Staatkundige Vorming
- Ideology: Christian democracy (Dutch); Cultural pluralism
- Political position: Centre to centre-right
- Religion: Catholicism
- European affiliation: European Union of Christian Democrats
- European Parliament group: Christian Democratic Group

The Catholic People's Party (Dutch: Katholieke Volkspartij, KVP) was a Catholic Christian democratic political party in the Netherlands. The party was founded in 1945 as a continuation of the interwar Roman Catholic State Party, which was in turn a successor of the General League of Roman Catholic Electoral Associations. The party was in government throughout its existence. In 1977, a federation of parties including the Catholic People's Party, the Anti-Revolutionary Party (ARP) and the Christian Historical Union (CHU) ran together under the Christian Democratic Appeal (CDA) banner. The three participating parties formally dissolved to form the CDA in 1980.

== History ==
=== 1945–1965 ===
The KVP was founded on 22 December 1945. It was a continuation of the pre-war Roman Catholic State Party (RKSP). Unlike the RKSP, the KVP was open to people of all denominations, but mainly Catholics supported the party. The party adopted a more progressive course and a more modern image than its predecessor.

In the 1946 general election, the party won a third of the vote, and joined the newly founded social democratic Labour Party (PvdA) to form a government coalition. This Roman/Red coalition ("Roman" for the KVP, "Red" for the PvdA) lasted until 1958. In the first two years, the KVP's Louis Beel led the Cabinet. Beel was not the party's leader, a post which was taken by Carl Romme, who led the KVP from the House of Representatives between 1946 and 1961. After the 1948 general election, the PvdA supplied the prime minister Willem Drees. The PvdA and the KVP were joined by combinations of the Protestant-Christian Anti-Revolutionary Party (ARP) and Christian Historical Union (CHU) and the liberal People's Party for Freedom and Democracy (VVD) to form oversized cabinets, which often held a comfortable two-thirds majority in the House of Representatives. The cabinets were oriented at rebuilding Dutch society and economy after the ravages of World War II and grant independence to Indonesia. That last point caused a split within the KVP; in 1948, a small group of Catholics opposed to decolonisation and cooperation with social democrats broke away to form the Catholic National Party (KNP). Under pressure of the Catholic Church, the two parties reunited in 1955.

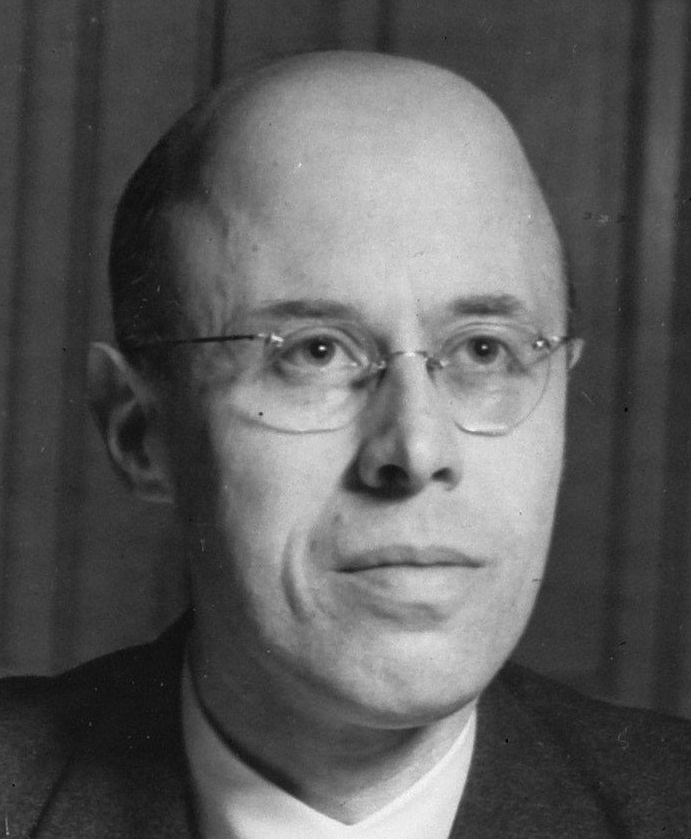
Louis Beel, Prime Minister from 1946 until 1948 and from 1958 until 1959.

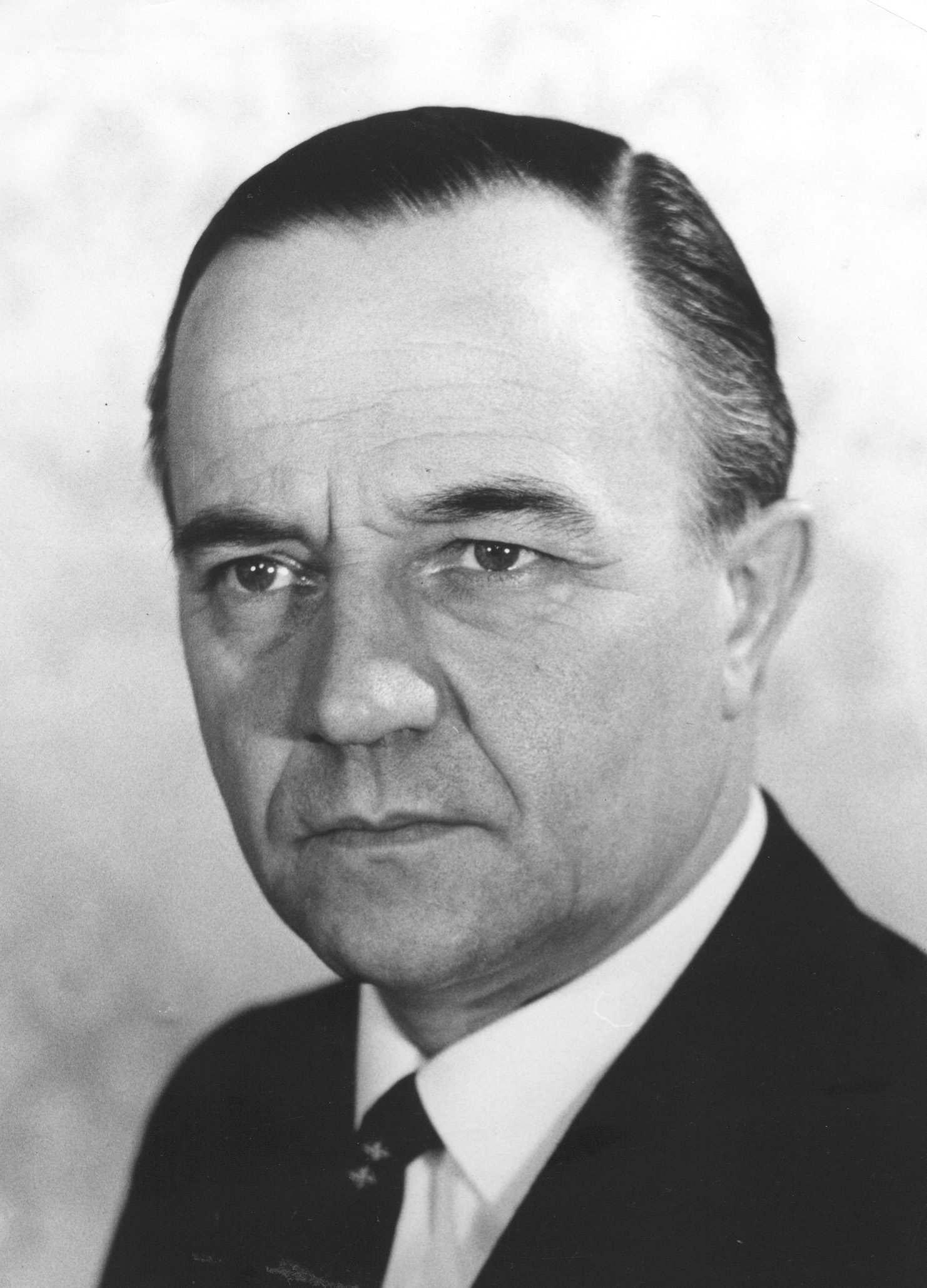
Piet de Jong, Prime Minister from 1967 until 1971.

The KVP was at the height of its power from 1958 to 1965. It was the dominant force in all cabinets, and every prime minister during this time was a party member. In 1958 the fourth Drees cabinet fell and Louis Beel formed an interim cabinet with KVP, ARP and CHU. After the 1959 general election, the KVP formed a centre-right cabinet with ARP, CHU and VVD, led by KVP member Jan de Quay. It continued to strengthen the welfare state. After the 1963 general election, this cabinet was succeeded by a new cabinet of KVP-CHU-ARP-VVD, which was led by the KVP's Victor Marijnen. This coalition oversaw an economic boom. Norbert Schmelzer became the party's new leader, again operating within the House of Representatives and not the cabinet. A cabinet crisis over the Netherlands Public Broadcasting, however, caused the cabinet to fall in 1965. The KVP and ARP formed a cabinet with the PvdA, led by the KVP's Jo Cals. This cabinet also fell in the Night of Schmelzer, in which Norbert Schmelzer forced a cabinet crisis over the cabinet's financial policy. This was the first fall of cabinet directly broadcast on television. An interim government of KVP and ARP was formed, led by the ARP's Jelle Zijlstra.

=== 1965–1980 ===
The period 1965–1980 was period of decline, crisis and dissent for the KVP. The party's vote share began to decline after 1966 as a result of depillarisation and secularisation; there were fewer Catholics, and Catholics no longer necessarily supported a Catholic party.

In the 1967 general election, the KVP lost 15% of its votes and eight seats. During the election campaign the KVP, ARP and CHU declared that they wanted to continue cooperating with each other. Cooperation with the PvdA was much less important. This led to unrest among young and left-wing KVP supporters, including Ruud Lubbers, Jo Cals, Erik Jurgens and Jacques Aarden, who called themselves Christian Radicals. After the election, this promise was upheld and the KVP formed a cabinet with its old partners, led by Piet de Jong. After much debate, some of the Christian Radicals broke away from the KVP in 1968 to form the Political Party of Radicals (PPR). These include three members of parliament, who form their own parliamentary party, Groep Aarden. Lubbers and Cals stayed with the KVP. The new party became a close partner of the PvdA. In the 1971 general election, the KVP lost another seven seats (18% of its vote). The KVP again joined the ARP, CHU and VVD to form a new centre-right cabinet with right-wing dissenters of the PvdA, united in Democratic Socialists '70 (DS'70). The ARP's Barend Biesheuvel led the cabinet. In 1972 the cabinet fell because of internal problems of the junior partner, DS'70.

In the subsequent election, the KVP again lost eight seats, leaving only 27, 23 less than in 1963. The cabinet lost its majority and the KVP saw no alternative than to cooperate with the PvdA and its allies PPR and Democrats 66 (D'66). An extra-parliamentary cabinet was formed by PvdA, PPR and D66 joined by prominent progressives from KVP and ARP. The KVP's ministers include the minister of Justice Dries van Agt and the minister of the Economy Ruud Lubbers. The KVP did not officially support this cabinet, which was led by social democrat Joop den Uyl. This cabinet was characterised by infighting and fell just before the 1977 general election.

In the 1970s, the KVP realised that if it was to continue, it needed to find new ways of cooperating. Ideas to form a broad Christian democratic party, like the German Christian Democratic Union, were brought into practice. In 1974 the three parties formed a federation, called Christian Democratic Appeal (CDA). In the 1977 election the CDA won more seats than the KVP, ARP and CHU had together. After the election, Dries van Agt became prime minister. In 1980, the three parties officially dissolved themselves into the CDA.

The Catholics still constitute a powerful group within the CDA. Indeed, the CDA's first two prime ministers, van Agt and Ruud Lubbers, came from the KVP side of the merger. In the early years, a system of equal representation of Catholics and Protestants was practiced, from which the KVP as the only Catholic group profited. Nowadays many CDA members, like Maxime Verhagen and Maria van der Hoeven have a background in the KVP's political Catholicism.

== Name ==
The name Catholic People's Party (Dutch: Katholieke Volkspartij; KVP), must be seen in contrast with the name of its predecessor Roman Catholic State Party. The party no longer uses the name "Roman Catholic", but simply "Catholic", de-emphasising its religious affiliation. It is no longer a state party, but a people's party, emphasising its progressive, democratic nature. The new name emphasises the KVP's progressive, democratic and non-denominational image.

== Ideology ==
The KVP was a Christian democratic party, which based itself on the Bible and Catholic dogma.

As such, it was a proponent of a mixed economy: A strong welfare state should be combined with a free market, with a corporatist organisation. Trade unions and employers' organisations were to negotiate on wages in a Social and Economic Council and should make legislation for some economic sectors on themselves, without government intervention, in so-called Productschappen. It was also described as conservative liberal party.

The state should watch over the morality of the people: divorce should be limited, recreation should be moral (for instance different swimming hours for women and men) and the family should be preserved. Families were to be helped by fiscal policies, such as the kinderbijslag, support by the government, by the newly set up Ministry of Culture, Recreation and Welfare, and the possibility to buy their own home.

Internationally, the KVP was a staunch proponent of European integration and cooperation within NATO. The party sought the middle ground in the issue of decolonisation: Indonesia and Suriname should be independent countries within a Dutch Commonwealth.

== Electoral performance ==
Election	Votes	%	Seats	±	Government
1946	1,466,582	30.8	32 / 100	▲1	Coalition
1948	1,531,154	31.0	32 / 100	0	Coalition
1952	1,529,508	28.7	30 / 100	▼2	Coalition
1956	1,815,310	31.7	49 / 150	▲19	Coalition
1959	1,895,914	31.6	49 / 150	0	Coalition
1963	1,995,352	31.9	50 / 150	▲1	Coalition
1967	1,822,904	26.5	42 / 150	▼8	Coalition
1971	1,379,672	21.8	35 / 150	▼7	Coalition
1972	1,305,401	17.7	27 / 150	▼8	Coalition

=== Municipal and provincial government ===
KVP members in Provincial legislatures (1950)
Province	Result (seats)
Groningen	2
Friesland	3
Drenthe	2
Overijssel	14
Gelderland	21
Utrecht	12
North Holland	19
South Holland	16
Zeeland	9
North Brabant	52
Limburg	39

The party was particularly strong in the southern provinces of Limburg and North Brabant, where it often held 90% of the seats in the provincial and municipal legislatures and supplied all provincial and municipal governments, provincial governors and mayors. In regions like Twente, West Friesland and Zeelandic Flanders it held similar positions in municipalities, but cooperated with other parties on the provincial level.

== Organisation ==
=== Leaders ===
Leader		Term of office	Age as leader	Lead candidate
Carl Romme	Carl Romme (1896–1980)	10 January 1946 – 18 February 1961 (15 years, 39 days)	49–64	1946; 1948; 1952; 1956; 1959
Wim de Kort	Dr. Wim de Kort (1909–1993)	15 August 1961 – 7 December 1963 (2 years, 114 days)	52–54	1963
Norbert Schmelzer	Norbert Schmelzer (1921–2008)	7 December 1963 – 25 February 1971 (7 years, 80 days)	42–50	1967
Gerard Veringa	Dr. Gerard Veringa (1924–1999)	25 February 1971 – 1 October 1971 (218 days)	46–47	1967
Frans Andriessen	Frans Andriessen (1929–2019)	1 October 1971 – 25 May 1977 (5 years, 236 days)	42–48	1972

- Chairs
  - Piet Witteman (22 December 1945 – 4 April 1946)
  - Jan Andriessen (4 April 1946 – 30 May 1953)
  - Harry van Doorn (30 May 1953 – 23 June 1962)
  - Piet Aalberse Jr. (23 June 1962 – 30 March 1968)
  - Fons van der Stee (30 March 1968 – 14 July 1971)
  - Dick de Zeeuw (14 July 1971 – 20 June 1975)
  - Wim Vergeer (20 June 1975 – 27 September 1980)
- Prime Ministers
  - Louis Beel (3 July 1946 – 7 August 1948, 22 December 1958 – 19 May 1959)
  - Jan de Quay (19 May 1959 – 24 July 1963)
  - Victor Marijnen (24 July 1963 – 14 April 1965)
  - Jo Cals (14 April 1965 – 22 November 1966)
  - Piet de Jong (5 April 1967 – 6 July 1971)

- Parliamentary leaders in the House of Representatives
  - Carl Romme (4 June 1946 – 25 October 1960)
  - Jan Andriessen (25 October 1960 – 19 September 1961)
  - Wim de Kort (19 September 1961 – 7 December 1963)
  - Norbert Schmelzer (7 December 1963 – 28 April 1971)
  - Piet Engels (28 April 1971 – 11 May 1971)
  - Gerard Veringa (11 May 1971 – 16 August 1971)
  - Frans Andriessen (16 August 1971 – 25 May 1977)
- Parliamentary leaders in the Senate
  - Jan van de Mortel (22 December 1945 – 23 July 1946)
  - Cor Kropman (23 July 1946 – 5 June 1963)
  - Harry van Lieshout (1 October 1963 – 7 October 1969)
  - Jan Niers (7 October 1969 – 11 May 1971)
  - Piet de Jong (11 May 1971 – 17 September 1974)
  - Jan Teijssen (17 September 1974 – 20 September 1977)

== Electorate ==
The KVP was supported by Catholics of all classes. Its strength was in the Catholic south of the Netherlands: North Brabant and Limburg, where it often obtained more than 90% of vote. It was also strong in Catholic regions like Twente, West Friesland and Zeelandic Flanders.

During the 1960s and 1970s, the KVP lost part of its electorate to progressive parties like the Political Party of Radicals, the Labour Party and Democrats 66.

== Organisation ==
=== Linked organisations ===
The KVP had an own youth organisation, the Catholic People's Party Youth Groups (Dutch: Katholieke Volkspartij Jongeren Groupen; KVPJG) and a scientific foundation, the Centre for Political Formation.

=== International organisations ===
In the European Parliament the KVP's members sat in the Christian Democratic group.

=== Pillarised organisations ===
The KVP had close links to many other Catholic institutions such as the Catholic Church and together they formed the Catholic pillar. These organisations included the Catholic Labour Union NKV, the Catholic Employers Organisation KNOV, the Catholic Farmers' Organisation KNBLTB, Catholic Hospitals united in the Yellow-White Cross and Catholic Schools. The Catholic broadcasting association Katholieke Radio Omroep and the Catholic newspaper De Volkskrant were the voices of the KVP.

=== Relationships to other parties ===
As a Christian party, the KVP had strong ties with the conservative Protestant Anti-Revolutionary Party and Christian Historical Union. The strong ties resulted in several cabinets in the period from 1946 to 1977 and the formation of the Christian Democratic Appeal, in which the three parties united in 1974.

The KVP had a strong centre-left group within its ranks. These supported closer cooperation with the social democratic Labour Party. This resulted in several cabinets with the PvdA, but also splits within the party, most notably the formation of the Political Party of Radicals

As noted by one study, in the early post-war years "the Catholic party was dominated by its left wing, with the result that the PvdA and the KVP had relatively few disagreements on policy issues." Beginning in 1952 however, "the focus of power within the KVP shifted to the right, resulting in frequent conflicts within the cabinet, especially in the area of economic and social policy." According to another study, the Catholic party shifted to the right between 1958 and 1963. Nevertheless, new social welfare benefits were established under successive KVP-led coalition governments.

== International comparison ==
As the party of a Catholic minority in a dominantly Protestant country, the KVP is comparable to the German Centre Party, which existed before World War II, and the Christian Democratic People's Party of Switzerland. Its political position and agenda are similar to other catholic Christian democratic parties in Europe, such as the Flemish Christian Democratic and Flemish party and the Italian Christian Democracy.

== Logo ==
Logos of the Catholic People's Party
Logo the party used from 1946

Logo the party used from 1970 to 1980
