= 1952 Dutch general election =

- 25 June 1952
- All 100 seats in the House of Representatives; 51 seats needed for a majority
- Turnout: 94.98% (▲1.31pp)
Party	Leader	Vote %	Seats	+/–
PvdA	Willem Drees	28.97	30	+3
KVP	Carl Romme	28.67	30	−2
ARP	Jan Schouten	11.31	12	−1
CHU	Hendrik Tilanus	8.92	9	0
VVD	Pieter Oud	8.83	9	+1
CPN	Paul de Groot	6.16	6	−2
KNP	Charles Welter	2.71	2	+1
SGP	Pieter Zandt	2.42	2	0
This lists parties that won seats. See the complete results below.
Most voter-for party by municipality
Prime Minister before	Prime Minister after
First Drees cabinet KVP–PvdA–CHU–VVD	Second Drees cabinet PvdA–KVP–ARP–CHU

General elections were held in the Netherlands on 25 June 1952. The Catholic People's Party and the Labour Party both won 30 of the 100 seats in the House of Representatives. It was the first time since 1913 that the Catholic People's Party and its predecessors had not received a plurality of the vote.

The elections led to a continuation of the previous four-party government, consisting of Labour, the Catholic People's Party, People's Party for Freedom and Democracy and the Christian Historical Union. However, three months after the elections the VVD left the government and were replaced by the Anti-Revolutionary Party.

== Results ==
Party	Votes	%	Seats	+/–
Labour Party	1,545,867	28.97	30	+3
Catholic People's Party	1,529,508	28.67	30	–2
Anti-Revolutionary Party	603,329	11.31	12	–1
Christian Historical Union	476,195	8.92	9	0
People's Party for Freedom and Democracy	471,040	8.83	9	+1
Communist Party of the Netherlands	328,621	6.16	6	–2
Catholic National Party	144,520	2.71	2	+1
Reformed Political Party	129,081	2.42	2	0
Reformed Political League	35,497	0.67	0	New
Middle Class Party	25,127	0.47	0	0
Party for Justice, Freedom and Welfare	18,990	0.36	0	New
Socialist Union	18,010	0.34	0	New
Young Conservative Union	9,960	0.19	0	0
Total	5,335,745	100.00	100	0
Valid votes	5,335,745	96.98		
Invalid/blank votes	165,981	3.02		
Total votes	5,501,726	100.00		
Registered voters/turnout	5,792,679	94.98		
Source: CBS, Nederlandse verkiezingsuitslagen

=== By province ===
Results by province
Province	PvdA	KVP	ARP	CHU	VVD	CPN	KNP	SGP	Others
Drenthe	41.8	6.2	16.8	12.9	14.8	4.4	0.3	0.3	2.4
Friesland	36.6	6.7	22.8	16.3	8.6	4.6	0.4	0.8	3.1
Gelderland	28.7	28.9	10.7	13.5	8.5	2.2	2.1	4.2	1.2
Groningen	38.0	5.2	18.2	10.2	12.6	9.0	0.7	0.2	5.7
Limburg	12.8	75.4	1.0	0.9	0.9	2.3	6.1	0.1	0.5
North Brabant	15.0	69.8	2.9	2.6	2.0	1.3	5.1	0.7	0.6
North Holland	32.7	21.1	9.6	5.2	11.3	14.6	2.8	0.6	2.0
Overijssel	26.8	26.3	11.2	14.2	8.5	6.2	1.4	3.1	2.4
South Holland	33.4	16.7	14.4	9.9	11.2	5.7	2.5	4.0	2.0
Southern IJsselmeer Polders	28.9	23.9	19.5	14.2	5.1	4.2	0.3	1.9	2.0
Utrecht	28.2	23.3	15.0	11.7	8.9	3.7	2.6	4.1	2.6
Zeeland	28.0	18.5	13.8	15.8	8.0	0.9	1.1	9.5	4.4
