= Max Steenberghe =

Dutch politician (1899–1972)

His Excellency Max Steenberghe
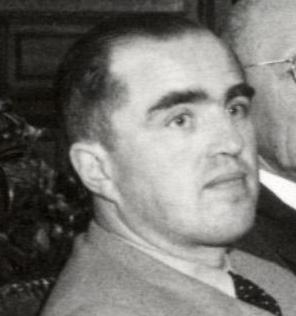
- Max Steenberghe in 1939

Minister of Finance
- In office 27 July 1941 – 17 November 1941
- Prime Minister: Pieter Sjoerds Gerbrandy
- Preceded by: Charles Welter
- Succeeded by: Willem Albarda

Minister of Commerce, Industry and Shipping
- In office 10 May 1940 – 17 November 1941
- Prime Minister: Dirk Jan de Geer (1940); Pieter Sjoerds Gerbrandy (1940–1941)
- Preceded by: Himself as Minister of Economic Affairs
- Succeeded by: Jan van den Tempel (ad interim)
- In office 24 June 1937 – 15 July 1937
- Prime Minister: Hendrikus Colijn
- Preceded by: Henri Gelissen
- Succeeded by: Himself as Minister of Economic Affairs

Member of the House of Representatives
- In office 8 June 1937 – 30 June 1937

Minister of Economic Affairs
- In office 10 August 1939 – 10 May 1940
- Prime Minister: Dirk Jan de Geer
- Preceded by: Hendrikus Colijn
- Succeeded by: Himself as Minister of Commerce, Industry and Shipping
- In office 15 July 1937 – 25 July 1939
- Prime Minister: Hendrikus Colijn
- Preceded by: Himself as Minister of Commerce, Industry and Shipping
- Succeeded by: Hendrikus Colijn
- In office 25 June 1934 – 6 June 1935
- Prime Minister: Hendrikus Colijn
- Preceded by: Hendrikus Colijn (ad interim)
- Succeeded by: Henri Gelissen

Minister of Agriculture and Fisheries
- In office 1 May 1941 – 17 November 1941
- Prime Minister: Pieter Sjoerds Gerbrandy
- Preceded by: Aat van Rhijn
- Succeeded by: Jan van den Tempel (ad interim)
- In office 10 August 1939 – 10 May 1940
- Prime Minister: Dirk Jan de Geer
- Preceded by: Hendrikus Colijn
- Succeeded by: Aat van Rhijn
- In office 24 June 1937 – 15 July 1937
- Prime Minister: Hendrikus Colijn
- Preceded by: Laurent Deckers
- Succeeded by: Himself as Minister of Economic Affairs

Personal details
- Born: Maximilien Paul Léon Steenberghe; 2 May 1899 Leiden, Netherlands
- Died: 22 January 1972 (aged 72) Goirle, Netherlands
- Party: Catholic People's Party (from 1945)
- Other political affiliations: Roman Catholic State Party (until 1945)
- Spouse: Catharina Ausems (m. 1921)
- Children: 4 daughters and 2 sons
- Education: Utrecht University (Bachelor of Laws, Master of Laws)
- Occupation: Politician · Jurist · Businessman · Corporate director · Nonprofit director

Maximilien Paul Léon "Max" Steenberghe (2 May 1899 – 22 January 1972) was a Dutch politician of the Roman Catholic State Party (RKSP), which later formed to the Catholic People's Party (KVP).

== Decorations ==
Honours
Ribbon bar	Honour	Country	Date	Comment
	Knight of the Order of the Netherlands Lion	Netherlands	15 June 1935	
	Grand Officer of the Order of Oranje-Nassau	Netherlands	31 August 1946	Elevated from Commander (15 July 1937)

Political offices
Preceded by Hendrikus Colijn; Ad interim	Minister of Economic Affairs; 1934–1935	Succeeded by Henri Gelissen
Preceded by Henri Gelissen	Minister of Commerce, Industry and Shipping; 1937	Succeeded by Himself as Minister of Economic Affairs
Preceded by Laurent Deckers	Minister of Agriculture and Fisheries; 1937	Succeeded by Himself as Minister of Economic Affairs
Preceded by Himself as Minister of Commerce, Industry and Shipping	Minister of Economic Affairs; 1937–1939	Succeeded by Hendrikus Colijn
Preceded by Hendrikus Colijn	Minister of Economic Affairs; 1939–1940	Succeeded by Aat van Rhijn as Minister of Agriculture and Fisheries
Preceded by Hendrikus Colijn	Minister of Economic Affairs; 1939–1940	Succeeded by Himself as Minister of Commerce, Industry and Shipping
Preceded by Himself as Minister of Economic Affairs	Minister of Commerce, Industry and Shipping; 1940–1941	Succeeded by Jan van den Tempel; Ad interim
Preceded by Aat van Rhijn	Minister of Agriculture and Fisheries; 1941	Succeeded by Jan van den Tempel; Ad interim
Preceded by Charles Welter	Minister of Finance; 1941	Succeeded by Willem Albarda
