= Gerrit Bolkestein =

Dutch politician (1871–1956)

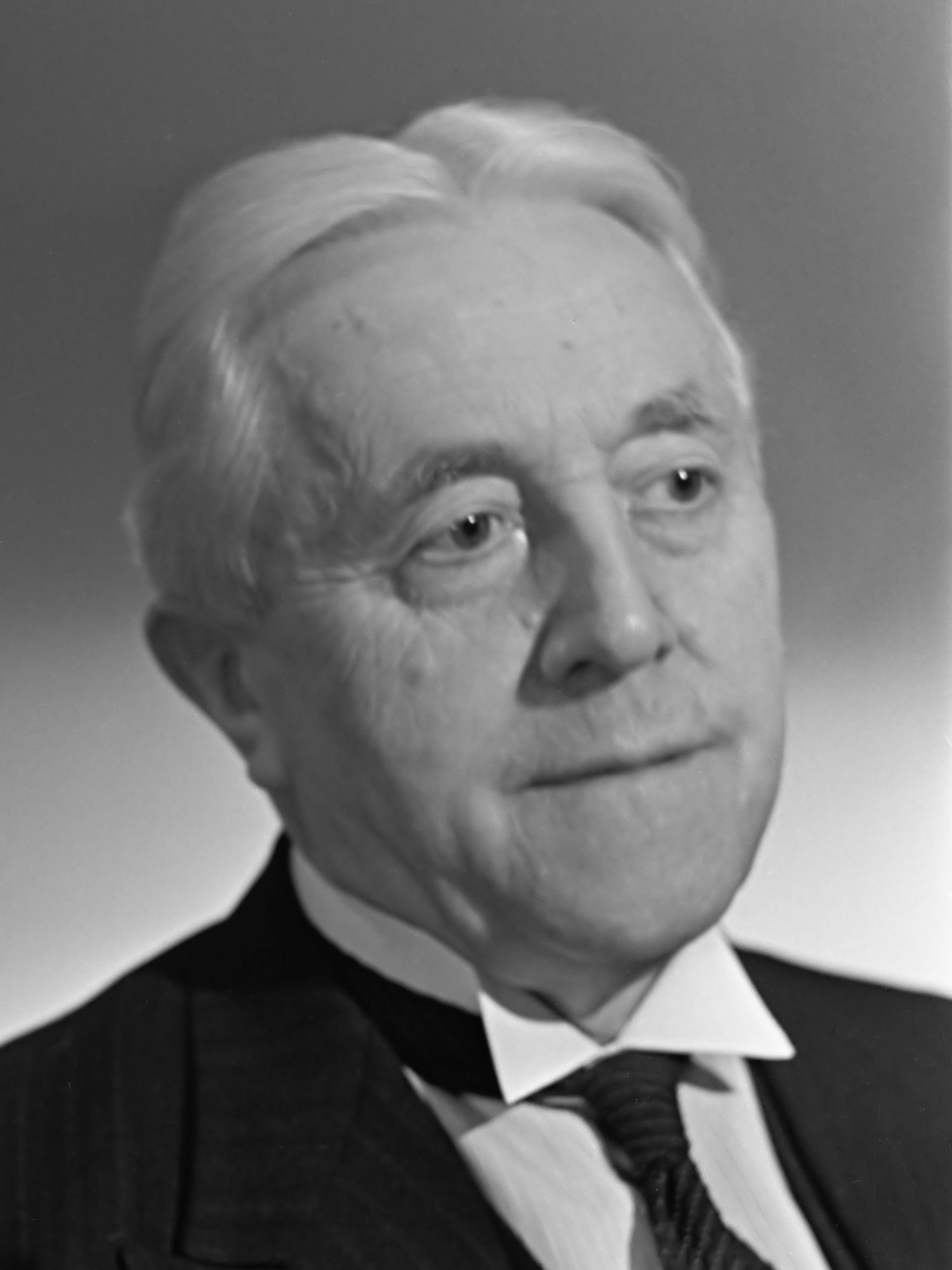
- Gerrit Bolkestein in 1942

Minister for Education, Arts and Sciences
- In office 1939–1945
- Monarch: Queen Wilhelmina
- Prime Minister: Dirk Jan de Geer

Personal details
- Born: Gerrit Bolkestein; 9 October 1871 Amsterdam, Netherlands
- Died: 8 September 1956 (aged 84) The Hague, Netherlands
- Resting place: Zorgvlied cemetery
- Party: Free-thinking Democratic League
- Spouse: Johanna Meijer

Gerrit Bolkestein (Dutch pronunciation: [ˈɣɛrɪd ˈbɔlkəstɛin]; (Note: Gerrit in isolation: [ˈɣɛrɪt].) 9 October 1871 – 8 September 1956) was a Dutch politician and member of the Free-thinking Democratic League.

Bolkestein was the Minister for Education, Art and Science from 1939 until 1945, and was part of the Dutch government-in-exile from 1940. In early 1944 he gave a radio address from London in which he said that after the war he would collect written evidence from Dutch people relating to the oppression they had endured during the Nazi occupation. Among those who heard the broadcast was Anne Frank who had been keeping a diary for two years, while she was in hiding. His comment that he was particularly interested in diaries and letters, led Frank to edit what had originally been a diary kept for her own amusement. Frank later died in Bergen-Belsen concentration camp, but her partially edited diary was saved, and eventually published in 1947.

Bolkestein was the grandfather of prominent market liberal Frits Bolkestein. He is buried at Zorgvlied cemetery.

== Notes ==
Political offices
Preceded by Bep Schrieke	Minister of Education, Arts and Sciences; 1939–1945	Succeeded by Gerard van der Leeuw
