= 1956 Dutch general election =

- 13 June 1956
- All 100 seats in the House of Representatives; 51 seats needed for a majority
- Turnout: 95.50%
Party	Leader	Vote %	Seats	+/–
PvdA	Willem Drees	32.69	34	+4
KVP	Carl Romme	31.69	33	+3
ARP	Jelle Zijlstra	9.91	10	−2
VVD	Pieter Oud	8.77	9	0
CHU	Hendrik Tilanus	8.43	8	−1
CPN	Paul de Groot	4.75	4	−2
SGP	Pieter Zandt	2.26	2	0
This lists parties that won seats. See the complete results below.
Most voted-for party by municipality
Cabinet before	Cabinet after
Second Drees cabinet PvdA–KVP–ARP–CHU	Third Drees cabinet PvdA–KVP–ARP–CHU

General elections were held in the Netherlands on 13 June 1956. For the first time, the Labour Party (PvdA) emerged as the largest party, winning 34 of the 100 seats in the House of Representatives.

The elections led to the continuation of a four-party coalition government consisting of the PvdA, Catholic People's Party, Anti-Revolutionary Party and Christian Historical Union.

== Results ==
Party	Votes	%	Seats	+/–
Labour Party	1,872,209	32.69	34	+4
Catholic People's Party	1,815,130	31.69	33	+3
Anti-Revolutionary Party	567,535	9.91	10	–2
People's Party for Freedom and Democracy	502,530	8.77	9	0
Christian Historical Union	482,915	8.43	8	–1
Communist Party of the Netherlands	272,054	4.75	4	–2
Reformed Political Party	129,517	2.26	2	0
Reformed Political League	37,206	0.65	0	0
National Union	28,960	0.51	0	New
Dutch Opposition Union	19,503	0.34	0	New
Total	5,727,559	100.00	100	0
Valid votes	5,727,559	97.92		
Invalid/blank votes	121,910	2.08		
Total votes	5,849,469	100.00		
Registered voters/turnout	6,125,210	95.50		
Source: CBS, Nohlen & Stöver

=== By province ===
Results by province
Province	PvdA	KVP	ARP	VVD	CHU	CPN	SGP	Others
Drenthe	44.6	6.9	15.7	15.2	12.2	3.4	0.3	1.8
Friesland	40.9	6.9	22.0	8.4	16.0	3.5	0.7	1.5
Gelderland	31.3	32.2	9.3	7.9	13.1	1.4	3.8	1.1
Groningen	42.2	5.9	17.3	12.9	9.6	7.6	0.2	4.2
Limburg	17.5	78.6	0.8	0.9	0.6	1.0	0.0	0.6
North Brabant	16.4	74.9	2.7	2.0	2.3	0.6	0.6	0.6
North Holland	37.3	23.7	8.2	11.8	5.1	11.9	0.6	1.4
Overijssel	31.8	28.0	10.2	7.6	13.1	4.2	3.0	2.2
South Holland	37.9	18.7	12.3	11.3	9.4	4.8	3.9	1.7
Southern IJsselmeer Polders	28.0	24.8	19.6	7.6	14.5	1.4	2.4	1.7
Utrecht	32.6	25.8	12.9	9.3	11.1	2.6	3.7	2.0
Zeeland	32.0	20.9	12.8	8.1	15.4	0.6	9.0	1.3

== Aftermath ==
As a result of a constitutional amendment later in 1956, the House of Representatives was increased from 100 to 150 members on 6 November 1956. Rather than hold fresh elections, the results of the June elections were recalculated on the basis of 150 members.

Party	Seats		
Party	Original	New total	+/–
Labour Party	34	50	+16
Catholic People's Party	33	49	+16
Anti-Revolutionary Party	10	15	+5
People's Party for Freedom and Democracy	9	13	+4
Christian Historical Union	8	13	+5
Communist Party of the Netherlands	4	7	+3
Reformed Political Party	2	3	+1
Total	100	150	+50
