= Adriaan Dijxhoorn =

Dutch soldier and politician (1889–1953)

Adriaan Quirinus Hendrik Dijxhoorn
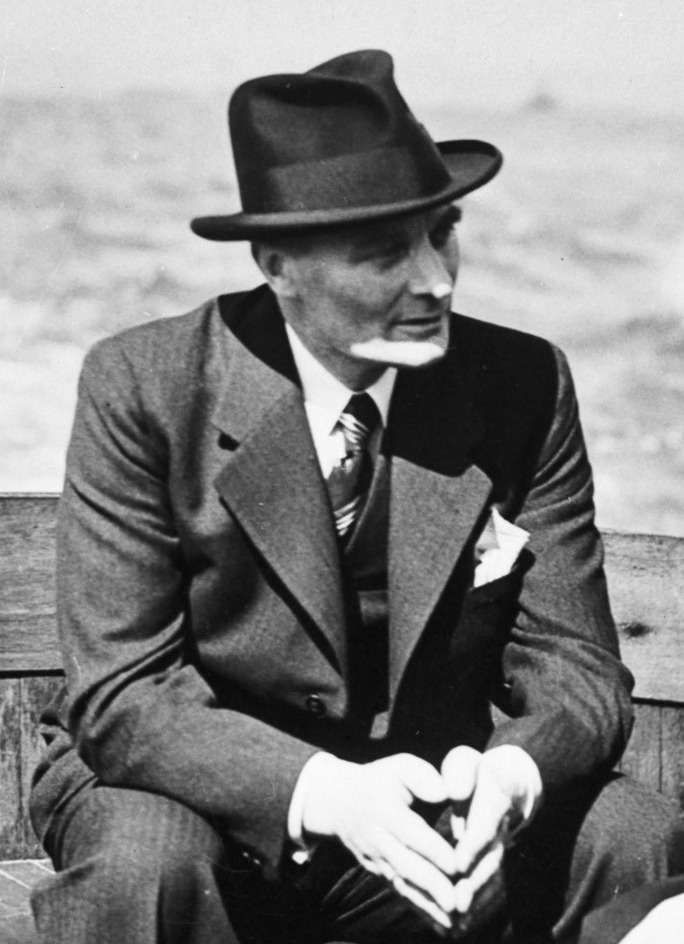
- Adrianus Dijxhoorn in 1940–41
- Born: 10 September 1889; Rotterdam, Netherlands
- Died: 22 January 1953 (aged 63) De Steeg, Netherlands
- Allegiance: Netherlands
- Branch: Royal Netherlands Army
- Conflicts: Battle of the Netherlands

Adriaan Quirinus Hendrik Dijxhoorn (10 September 1889 – 22 January 1953) was a Dutch soldier who served as Minister of Defence during the Battle of the Netherlands. Following the outbreak of the Second World War he was appointed Minister of Defence in August 1939 as part of the second De Geer Cabinet. Dijxhoorn clashed with the Supreme Commander of the Dutch Army, General Izaak H. Reijnders, over strategy, leading to Reijnders' resignation and replacement with General Henri Winkelman. Together with Queen Wilhelmina and the rest of the cabinet he left for London and continued as Minister of Defence in the Dutch government-in-exile until his resignation in June 1941.

Dijxhoorn was subsequently appointed the Dutch Military Representative to the Combined Chiefs of Staff in Washington. He served as acting Chief of the General Staff in 1945 and then as a member of the Supreme Military Court until his death.
