= Dirk Jan de Geer =

Dutch politician (1870–1960)

Jonkheer Dirk Jan de Geer
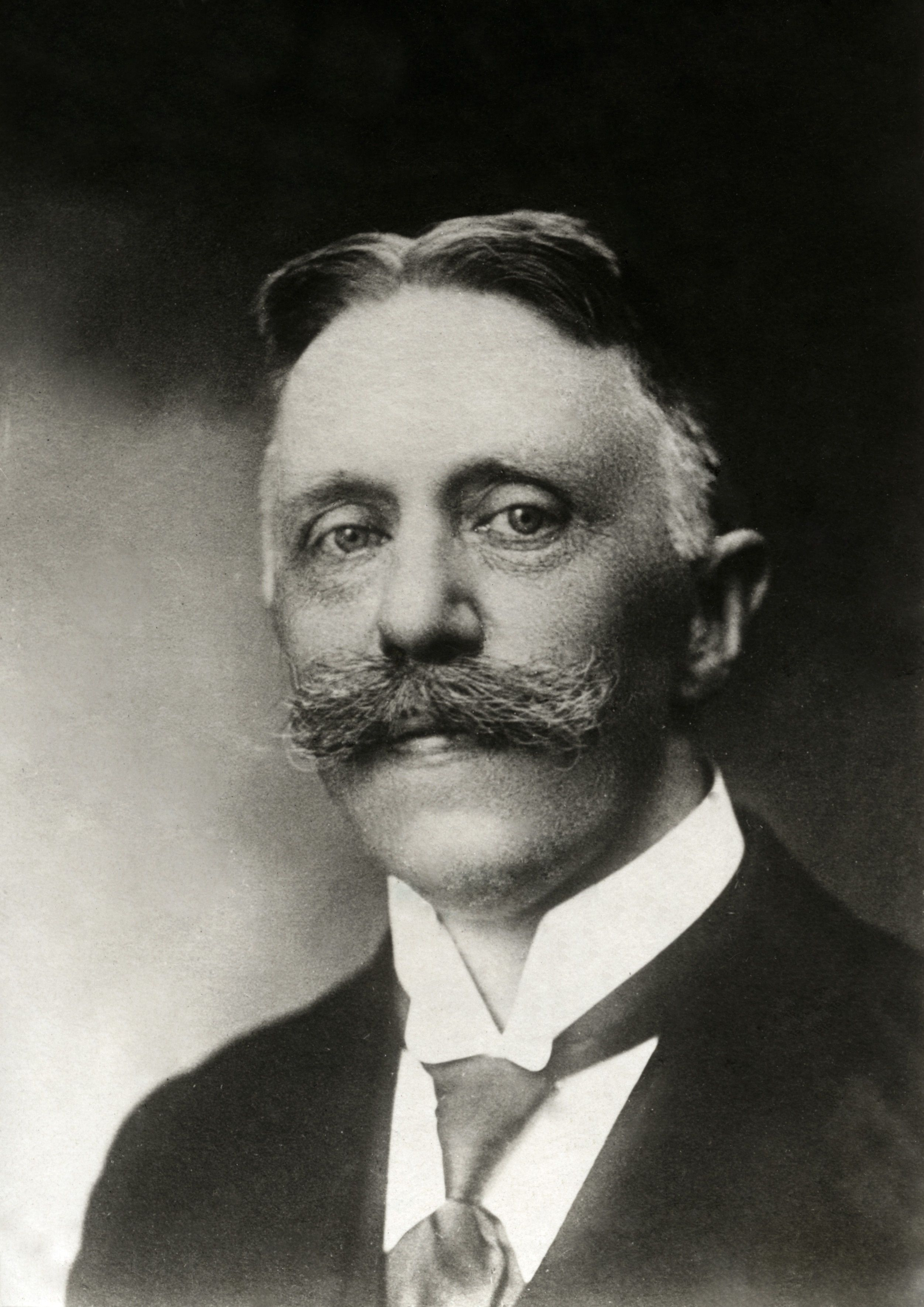
- De Geer in 1929

Chairman of the Council of Ministers
- In office 10 August 1939 – 3 September 1940
- Monarch: Wilhelmina
- Preceded by: Hendrikus Colijn
- Succeeded by: Pieter Sjoerds Gerbrandy
- In office 8 March 1926 – 10 August 1929
- Monarch: Wilhelmina
- Preceded by: Hendrikus Colijn
- Succeeded by: Charles Ruijs de Beerenbrouck

Chairman of the Christian Historical Union
- In office 30 June 1933 – 10 August 1939
- Preceded by: Jan Rudolph Slotemaker de Bruïne
- Succeeded by: Hendrik Tilanus

Parliamentary leader in the House of Representatives
- In office 28 April 1933 – 10 August 1939
- Preceded by: Reinhardt Snoeck Henkemans
- Succeeded by: Hendrik Tilanus
- Parliamentary group: Christian Historical Union

Leader of the Christian Historical Union
- In office 8 July 1929 – 14 May 1940
- Preceded by: Johan de Visser
- Succeeded by: Hendrik Tilanus

Minister of the Interior and Agriculture
- In office 4 August 1925 – 8 March 1926
- Prime Minister: Hendrikus Colijn
- Preceded by: Charles Ruijs de Beerenbrouck
- Succeeded by: Jan Kan

Minister of Finance
- In office 10 August 1939 – 3 September 1940
- Prime Minister: Dirk Jan de Geer
- Preceded by: Christiaan Bodenhausen
- Succeeded by: Charles Welter
- In office 8 March 1926 – 26 May 1933
- Prime Minister: Dirk Jan de Geer (1926–1929); Charles Ruijs de Beerenbrouck (1929–1933)
- Preceded by: Hendrikus Colijn
- Succeeded by: Pieter Oud
- In office 28 July 1921 – 11 August 1923
- Prime Minister: Charles Ruijs de Beerenbrouck
- Preceded by: Simon de Vries
- Succeeded by: Hendrikus Colijn

Mayor of Arnhem
- In office 8 May 1920 – 28 July 1921
- Preceded by: Aarnoud van Heemstra
- Succeeded by: Salomon de Monchy

Member of the House of Representatives
- In office 9 May 1933 – 10 August 1939
- In office 25 July 1922 – 18 September 1922
- In office 4 November 1907 – 30 August 1921

Personal details
- Born: Dirk Jan de Geer; 14 December 1870 Groningen, Netherlands
- Died: 28 November 1960 (aged 89) Soest, Netherlands
- Party: Christian Historical Union (from 1908)
- Other political affiliations: Christian Historical Party (1903–1908); Christian Historical Voters' League (until 1903)
- Spouse: Maria Voorhoeve (m. 1904; died 1955)
- Relations: Boudewijn de Geer (grandson); Mike de Geer (great-grandson)
- Children: 5
- Education: Utrecht University (LLB, LLM)
- Occupation: Politician; civil servant; jurist; managing editor; author

Jonkheer Dirk Jan de Geer (14 December 1870 – 28 November 1960) was a Dutch politician of the Christian Historical Union. He served as Chairman of the Council of Ministers from 8 March 1926 until 10 August 1929, and from 10 August 1939 until 3 September 1940.

== Life ==
Born in Groningen, he was a descendant of the De Geer family. After receiving his J.D. from a college of law in 1895, De Geer worked as a journalist and acted as a town councilor of Rotterdam (1901–1907).

He served from 1907 as a Christian Historical member of Parliament. Before World War II, he was a stable and respected politician. From 1920 to 1921, he served as mayor of Arnhem. Between 1921 and 1923, De Geer served as Minister of Finance. He resigned in 1923 because of his disagreement with the Naval Law of 1924. From 1925 to 1926 he served as Minister of the Interior and Minister of Agriculture, then became Chairman of the Council of Ministers on 8 March 1926, serving for three years until resigning on 10 August 1929. He also served as Minister of Finance from 1926 to 1933.

After the fall of the fifth cabinet of Hendrikus Colijn, De Geer again formed a government in August 1939 and concurrently held the offices of Minister of Finance and of General Affairs. However, as he knew, he was not suited for the role of prime minister of a nation at war. When Nazi Germany attacked the Netherlands on 10 May 1940 (beginning of the Western campaign), the situation soon became very serious, and the government fled to Britain.

In Britain, De Geer advocated negotiating a separate peace between the Netherlands and Germany, and damaged the Dutch government and Dutch morale by openly stating that the war could never be won. At the instigation of Queen Wilhelmina, he was removed from office and replaced by Pieter Sjoerds Gerbrandy during the 1940 cabinet formation – officially on account of ill-health.

Later, he was sent with a diplomatic commission to the Dutch East Indies, now Indonesia. He never arrived there, for on a stopover in Portugal he left the flight and went to the Germans, who allowed him to return to his ailing wife and the rest of his family in the Netherlands.

That greatly angered Wilhelmina, who called him a traitor and deserter to the Dutch cause. He later wrote a controversial pamphlet with "instructions" for the Dutch people on how to co-operate with the German occupiers. Wilhelmina warned De Geer that if he published the pamphlet, he would be put on trial after the conclusion of the war. "With this pamphlet," the Dutch government-in-exile stated in a broadcast, "the writer has betrayed the Netherlands people, whatever happens to him personally."

With the permission of the Reichskommissariat Niederlande, De Geer went through with the publication. After the war, he was found guilty of high treason in time of war and was stripped of all of his honorary titles. The Appeal Court confirmed the sentence of a year's imprisonment with three years' probation, but waived the fine of 20,000 guilders and the deprivation of the title "Minister of State".

== Personal ==
On 11 August 1904, De Geer married Maria Voorhoeve (1 May 1883 – 6 April 1955).

De Geer died on 28 November 1960 at Soest, at the age of 89, sixteen days before his 90th birthday, several years after having suffered a stroke.

His grandson is ex-footballer Boudewijn de Geer, and his great-grandson is football manager and former player Mike de Geer.

== Decorations ==
Honours
Ribbon bar	Honour	Country	Date	Comment
	Knight Grand Cross of the Order of the Netherlands Lion	Netherlands	31 August 1933	Stripped of title on 15 March 1950
	Commander of the Order of Orange-Nassau	Netherlands	11 August 1923	Stripped of title on 15 March 1950

Honorific titles
Ribbon bar	Honour	Country	Date	Comment
	Minister of State	Netherlands	31 August 1933	Style of Excellency; Stripped of title on 12 November 1947

House of Representatives of the Netherlands
Preceded by Otto van Limburg Stirum	Member for Schiedam; 1907–1918	District abolished
Party political offices
Preceded by Johan de Visser	Leader of the Christian; Historical Union; 1929–1940	Succeeded by Hendrik Tilanus
Preceded by Reinhardt Snoeck; Henkemans	Parliamentary leader of the Christian Historical Union in the House of Representatives; 1933–1939	Succeeded by Hendrik Tilanus
Preceded by Jan Rudolph; Slotemaker de Bruïne	Chairman of the Christian; Historical Union; 1933–1939	Succeeded by Hendrik Tilanus
Political offices
Preceded by Aarnoud van Heemstra	Mayor of Arnhem; 1920–1921	Succeeded by Salomon de Monchy
Preceded by Simon de Vries	Minister of Finance; 1921–1923	Succeeded by Hendrikus Colijn
Preceded by Charles Ruijs de Beerenbrouck	Minister of the Interior and Agriculture; 1925–1926	Succeeded by Jan Kan
Preceded by Hendrikus Colijn	Chairman of the Council of Ministers; 1926–1929	Succeeded by Charles Ruijs de Beerenbrouck
Preceded by Hendrikus Colijn	Minister of Finance; 1926–1933	Succeeded by Pieter Oud
Preceded by Hendrikus Colijn	Chairman of the Council of Ministers; 1939–1940	Succeeded by Pieter Sjoerds Gerbrandy
Preceded by Hendrikus Colijn	Minister of General Affairs; 1939–1940	Succeeded by Hendrik van Boeijen
Preceded by Christiaan Bodenhausen	Minister of Finance; 1939–1940	Succeeded by Charles Welter
