= Fifth Colijn cabinet =

Cabinet of the Netherlands in 1939

- Cabinet of the Netherlands

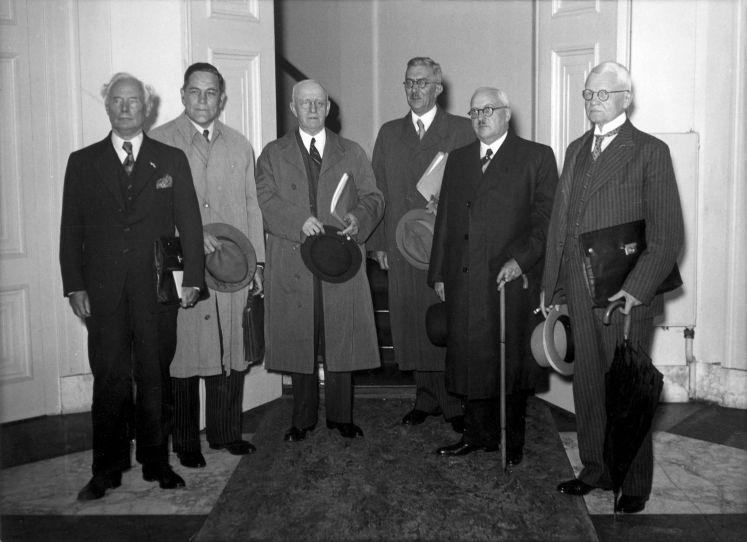
- The members of the incoming Fifth Colijn cabinet on 24 July 1939
- Date formed: 25 July 1939
- Date dissolved: 10 August 1939 (Demissionary from 27 July 1939)

People and organisations
- Head of state: Queen Wilhelmina
- Head of government: Hendrikus Colijn
- No. of ministers: 10
- Member party: Anti-Revolutionary Party (ARP); Christian Historical Union (CHU); Liberal State Party (LSP)
- Status in legislature: Right-wing minority government

History
- Legislature terms: 1937–1946
- Predecessor: Fourth Colijn cabinet
- Successor: Second De Geer cabinet

The Fifth Colijn cabinet was the cabinet of the Netherlands from 25 July 1939 until 10 August 1939. The cabinet was formed by the political parties Anti-Revolutionary Party (ARP), Christian Historical Union (CHU) and the Liberal State Party (LSP). The right-wing cabinet was a minority government in the House of Representatives. It was the last of five cabinets of Hendrikus Colijn, the Leader of the Anti-Revolutionary Party as Chairman of the Council of Ministers.

== Formation ==
The previous Fourth Colijn cabinet had fallen on 29 June 1939, because Colijn refused to implement the plans of Minister of Social Affairs Carl Romme, after which the ministers of the Roman Catholic State Party (RKSP) refused to continue working with Colijn.

Colijn attempted to form a new cabinet with the RKSP, and on 5 July 1939, he held talks with the leaders of the parties represented in the House of Representatives. Party leaders of the RKSP and Free-thinking Democratic League (VDB) objected to Colijn's plans to cut spending in all areas except defense. Colijn asked Queen Wilhelmina to relieve him of his task as formateur, but she refused because she did not yet know who would succeed Colijn. Only after the Queen had consulted with the president of the Senate and the speaker of the House of Representatives and several other dignitaries at Noordeinde Palace on 7 July was Colijn relieved of his duties as formateur the next day. In his stead the Queen appointed Dionysius Koolen, former minister and former speaker of the House of Representatives. Koolen, who belonged to the right wing of the RKSP, was unable to make any progress, and he was relieved of his post as formateur on 13 July. The Queen reappointed Colijn as formateur, much to the annoyance of the RKSP. Colijn said he had little enthusiasm for the task, but accepted it as a dutiful man. He later stated that he was “more of an officer who obeys than a statesman who decides according to his own responsibility.”

On 25 July, Colijn succeeded in forming a cabinet consisting of conservative figures from the Anti-Revolutionary Party (ARP), the Christian Historical Union (CHU), the Liberal State Party (LSP), and independent liberals. The cabinet was formed outside the parties, which meant that ministers joined on their own authority. There was no place in the new cabinet for the RKSP, which considered the entire formation a farce. The fall of the cabinet was brought about that same day by the adoption of a motion submitted by RKSP party leader Laurent Deckers, which condemned the cabinet's actions. This motion was supported by the RKSP, SDAP, VDB, CDU, and the CPN. The ARP, CHU, the LSP, NSB, and the SGP voted against.

Initially, it appeared that Colijn would disregard the ruling of the House of Representatives. He was supported in this line of thinking by the authoritarian professor at Utrecht University Carel Gerretson. However, Member of Parliament Anne Anema (ARP) convinced Colijn that the House's ruling left him no choice but to offer the cabinet's resignation. The cabinet was dismissed by the Queen on 27 July 1939, just two days after it took office, and on 10 August, the center-left Second De Geer cabinet came to power.

== Composition ==
Title	Minister			Term of office	
Title	Image	Name	Party	Start	End
Chairman of the Council of Ministers; Minister of General Affairs; Minister of Economic Affairs	Hendrikus Colijn	Hendrikus Colijn	ARP	25 July 1939	10 August 1939
Minister of Interior	Hendrik van Boeijen	Hendrik van Boeijen	CHU	25 July 1939	10 August 1939
Minister of Foreign Affairs	Jacob Adriaan Nicolaas Patijn	Jacob Adriaan Nicolaas Patijn	Indep. (Note: Liberal)	25 July 1939	10 August 1939
Minister of Finance	Christiaan Bodenhausen	Christiaan Bodenhausen	Indep.	25 July 1939	10 August 1939
Minister of Justice	Johan de Visser	Johan de Visser	CHU	25 July 1939	10 August 1939
Minister of Defence	Jannes van Dijk	Jannes van Dijk	ARP	25 July 1939	10 August 1939
Minister of Social Affairs	Marinus Damme	Marinus Damme	Indep.	25 July 1939	10 August 1939
Minister of Education, Arts and Sciences	Bep Schrieke	Bep Schrieke	Indep.	25 July 1939	10 August 1939
Minister of Water Management	Otto van Lidth de Jeude	Otto van Lidth de Jeude	LSP	25 July 1939	10 August 1939
Minister of Colonial Affairs	Cornelis van den Bussche	Cornelis van den Bussche	Indep.	25 July 1939	10 August 1939
Source: Parlement & Politiek (in Dutch)
