= Fourth Colijn cabinet =

Cabinet of the Netherlands, 1937 to 1939

- Cabinet of the Netherlands

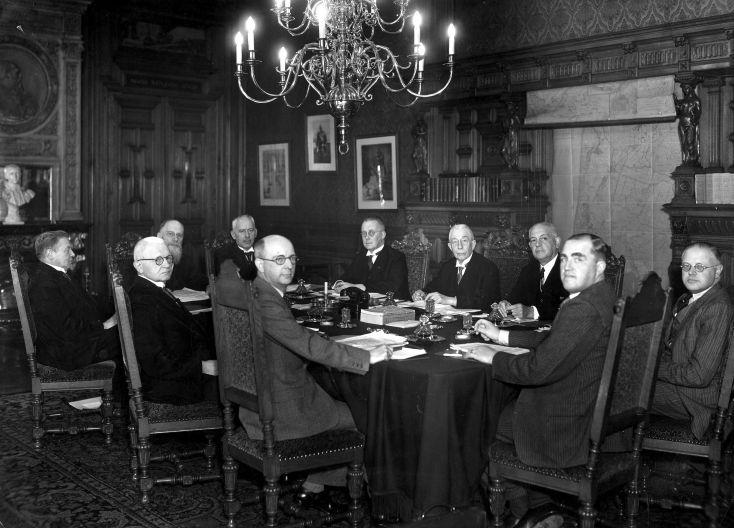
- Meeting of the Fourth Colijn cabinet in 1937
- Date formed: 24 June 1937
- Date dissolved: 25 July 1939 (Demissionary from 29 June 1939)

People and organisations
- Head of state: Queen Wilhelmina
- Head of government: Hendrikus Colijn
- No. of ministers: 11
- Ministers removed: 1
- Member party: Roman Catholic State Party; Anti-Revolutionary Party; Christian Historical Union
- Status in legislature: Right-wing majority government

History
- Election: 1937 general election
- Legislature terms: 1937–1946
- Predecessor: Third Colijn cabinet
- Successor: Fifth Colijn cabinet

The Fourth Colijn cabinet was the cabinet of the Netherlands from 24 June 1937 until 25 July 1939. The cabinet was formed by the political parties Roman Catholic State Party (RKSP), Anti-Revolutionary Party (ARP) and the Christian Historical Union (CHU) after the 1937 general election. The right-wing cabinet was a majority government in the House of Representatives. It was the fourth of five cabinets of Hendrikus Colijn, the Leader of the Anti-Revolutionary Party as Chairman of the Council of Ministers.

== Composition ==
Title	Minister			Term of office	
Title	Image	Name	Party	Start	End
Chairman of the Council of Ministers	Hendrikus Colijn	Hendrikus Colijn	ARP	24 June 1937	25 July 1939
Minister of General Affairs	Hendrikus Colijn	Hendrikus Colijn	ARP	8 July 1937	25 July 1939
Minister of the Interior	Hendrik van Boeijen	Hendrik van Boeijen	CHU	24 June 1937	25 July 1939
Minister of Foreign Affairs	Hendrikus Colijn	Hendrikus Colijn (ad interim)	ARP	24 June 1937	4 October 1937
Minister of Foreign Affairs	Jacob Adriaan Nicolaas Patijn	Jacob Adriaan Nicolaas Patijn	Indep. (Note: Liberal)	4 October 1937	25 July 1939
Minister of Finance	Jacob Adriaan de Wilde	Jacob Adriaan de Wilde	ARP	24 June 1937	19 May 1939
Minister of Finance	Hendrikus Colijn	Hendrikus Colijn (ad interim)	ARP	19 May 1939	25 July 1939
Minister of Justice	Carel Goseling	Carel Goseling	RKSP	24 June 1937	25 July 1939
Minister of Commerce, Industry and Shipping (1937); Minister of Agriculture and Fisheries (1937 ad interim); Minister of Economic Affairs (1937–1939)	Max Steenberghe	Max Steenberghe	RKSP	24 June 1937	25 July 1939
Minister of Defence	Jannes van Dijk	Jannes van Dijk	ARP	24 June 1937	25 July 1939
Minister of Social Affairs	Carl Romme	Carl Romme	RKSP	24 June 1937	25 July 1939
Minister of Education, Arts and Sciences	Jan Rudolph Slotemaker de Bruïne	Jan Rudolph Slotemaker de Bruïne	CHU	24 June 1937	25 July 1939
Minister of Water Management	Johan van Buuren	Johan van Buuren	Indep.	24 June 1937	25 July 1939
Minister of Colonial Affairs	Charles Welter	Charles Welter	RKSP	24 June 1937	25 July 1939
Source: Parlement & Politiek (in Dutch)
