= Great Depression in the Netherlands =

Economic crisis between 1933 and 1936

The Great Depression in the Netherlands (Dutch: De Grote Depressie, also called the crisis years: de Crisisjaren, de Crisistijd) occurred between 1933 and 1936, significantly later than in most other countries. It was a period of severe economic crisis in the 1930s which affected countries around the world, including the Netherlands.

In the United States, the Wall Street crash of 1929 is understood as the start of the Great Depression. But in the Netherlands the depression started more gradually, in 1929–1931, while the economy had been in a gradual decline for a longer period. In the Netherlands the depression lasted significantly longer than in most countries, partly because of structural characteristics of the Dutch economy and partly because of the policy of the government. The refusal to drop the gold standard plays a central role. The Great Depression led to political instability and riots, and can be linked to the rise of the National Socialist Movement in the Netherlands. The depression in the Netherlands lessened at the end of 1936, but real economic stability did not return until after World War II.

== Prelude (1918-1929) ==
Because of its neutrality in World War I, the Netherlands did not face the problems of war reparations, war damage and population loss which caused economic problems in other European countries. But because of the international character of the Dutch economy these problems also had their consequences for the Netherlands. In particular, the unrest and economic problems in Germany, one of the Netherlands' main trading partners, in the early 1920s plunged the Netherlands into a severe depression until 1925 (lowest point reached in 1923).

After 1925, partly because of economic improvements in Germany, the post-war depression in the Netherlands ended and the country rejoined the gold standard. However, among others because of strong trade restrictions in Germany, this improvement was limited and did not cause an economic boom as in some other European countries and the United States (associated with the Roaring Twenties). In spite of these slight economic improvements the Dutch economy struggled with structural problems in the period before the Great Depression. Trade restrictions and economic protectionism had not fully disappeared after World War I, and world trade failed to pick up again after the war. The Dutch economy had long been dependent on international trade and finance (in 1929 an estimated 30% of the GNP came from export), and especially the big shipping sector suffered from the lack of trading opportunities. Another problem was the combination of high post-World War I birthrates and increasing labour productivity, which meant that any increase of demand did not cause general welfare increase or a decrease of unemployment.

== Poverty and support ==
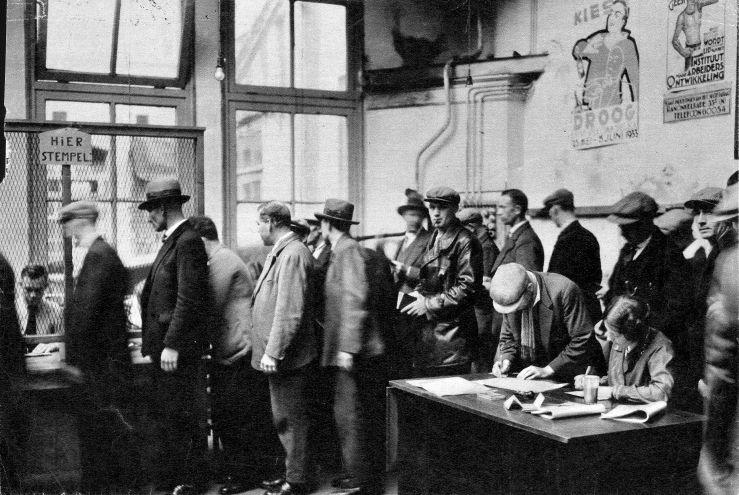
A line of unemployed people in Amsterdam, 1933.

Until 1931 the social consequences of the economic crisis had been limited; by decreasing work hours and wages, mass unemployment had so far been avoided in most sectors. However, around 1931 mass unemployment did start and those workers who could keep their jobs often had to accept significant wage cuts. Rough estimates of unemployment show a surge between 1930 and 1932, and a steady increase up to the end of 1936. Not every sector of the economy suffered equally; while the shipping and trading sectors were hit especially hard, some specialised sectors, such as the tobacco industry, survived the first stage of the depression relatively unharmed.

At the start of the depression, employed workers still saw their wage cuts matched by strong decreases of the price of consumption articles. But after the first years of the depression they too suffered from a decrease in real income. For the increasing numbers of unemployed, the situation was much worse. Until the 1930s, Dutch society did not have the experience and infrastructure needed to deal with mass unemployment. In large parts of society, it was felt that unemployed people should above all be stimulated to find work, so only income support at subsistence level should be given. Even though finding work had now become impossible for large numbers of people, social sentiments towards the unemployed changed only slowly.

Labour unions had funds for temporary income support for newly unemployed workers, to which the government added some subsidy. So union members were spared real poverty for a limited period. In the later stages of the depression, however, these union funds became depleted while the government also reduced its subsidy, forcing unions to steadily decrease the time period and amount of support. Non-unionised workers and workers whose union support period had run out depended on a government poverty fund, which supported them up to subsistence level. This minimal income support came with a heavy social stigma, which reflected the values of contemporary society. Support receivers had to report at a government agency twice a day, waiting in the endless lines of unemployed which became a symbol of the depression. They also had to allow government inspectors to visit them at home and investigate their daily life, which quickly became a strongly hated practice among the unemployed.

Social stigmatisation also took the form of clearly recognisable signs, such as red coloured subsidised clothing and the especially painful sign that a person was exempt from bicycle taxation (to be worn on a bicycle or on one's clothing). In addition to scarce government aid, there were private initiatives to support the poor. The most important of these organisations was the Nationaal Crisis Comité (National Crisis Committee), established by Princess Juliana in 1931. But because of the limited scale of this organisation, it was unable to structurally improve the situation.

== Social unrest ==
As most other countries, the Netherlands experienced significant social unrest during the Great Depression. But except for a number of impressive events, this unrest was actually quite limited in scale. Statistics of labour strikes, for example, show that during the 1931–1937 period strikes were actually less common in the Netherlands than in the previous years of economic stability from 1925 to 1930. At the height of the Great Depression in the Netherlands, the number of strikes was lowest. Another form of protest was rentstriking, the refusal by a tenant to pay rent to a landlord. This form of protest was also quite limited in scale, partly because of harsh government intervention.

More impressive was the strike or mutiny in 1933 of the sailors of De Zeven Provinciën, an armored ship of the Royal Netherlands Navy. As earlier in the United Kingdom (Invergordon Mutiny), the sailors protested a cut of their wages. The mutiny ended when the Dutch army bombed the ship, killing 22 of the sailors and forcing the rest of the crew to surrender. In 1934 another impressive event took place known as the Jordaanoproer. A reduction of the already low government unemployment support sparked protest and riots in several cities in the Netherlands, most strongly in the Jordaan neighbourhood of Amsterdam. Between 4 July and 9 July, the riots and subsequent harsh intervention by police and military police claimed six lives and wounded dozens more.

The upheaval of the Great Depression can also be linked to a rise of xenophobia and the, albeit limited, success of the National Socialist Movement (NSB). Founded in 1931, the NSB gained some popularity during the depression, with a peak of support in terms of its membership in 1936. When the strength of the depression lessened after 1937, support for the NSB fell again.

== Government policy ==
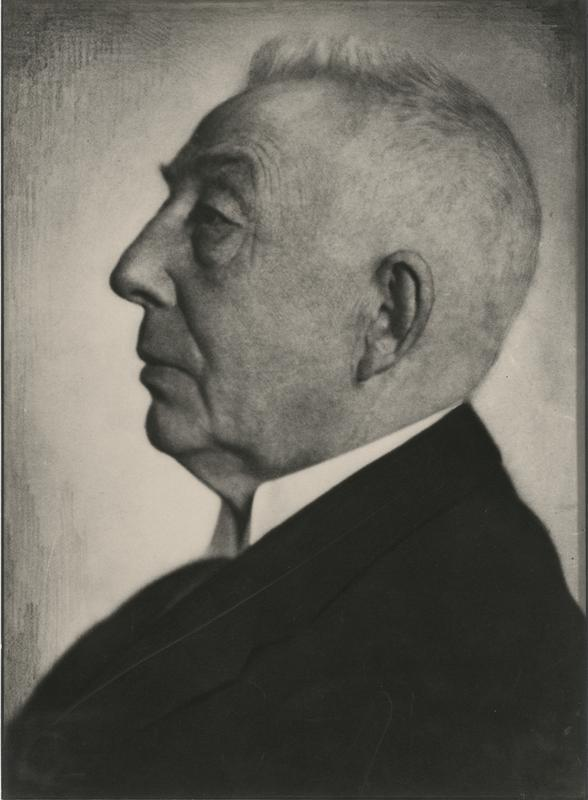
Hendrik Colijn, Prime Minister during much of the Great Depression.

An important difference between the Great Depression in the Netherlands and the situation in most other affected countries was the role of the government. Until the late 1930s the Dutch government, headed from 1933 to 1939 by the Anti-Revolutionary statesman Hendrik Colijn, could be described as non-interventionist and strongly internationalist. Its economic policy focussed mainly on keeping a balanced budget for government spending and income. While this government policy was typical for contemporary European and American governments, it was applied especially strictly in the Netherlands until the late stages of the depression.

In the first years of the depression government policy limited itself to supporting the most heavily affected sectors of the economy. In 1931 a wheat law was issued (Dutch: Tarwewet), which forced importers of foreign wheat to add a quantity of more expensive Dutch wheat before sale, to promote the troubled Dutch agriculture. Starting in 1932 a series of "crisis laws" was issued to further subsidise the agricultural and shipping sectors, and to enable a measure of government control on import, export and capital flows. From 1934 onward the Dutch government also experimented with a Labour Fund (Dutch: Werkfonds) to provide subsidised workplaces for the unemployed, often on large scale public works (comparable with the New Deal in the United States).

The scale of these government interventions was however too small to really change the situation. While government intervention on the economy was very limited, the Dutch government did lower its spending (including income support to the poor and unemployed) and raised taxes to keep its budget balanced. The effect of this was that while poverty increased, government support to the poor decreased. Such a government policy is heavily criticised by the Keynesian school of economics, which at that time was still in its infancy. Keynesianism stresses that governments should play an active role in promoting public and private consumption during an economic depression, so a balanced government budget should only be aimed at on the long run.

The Dutch government was also very reluctant to intervene in its trade policy. While most industrialised countries strongly increased their trade restrictions from the early stages of the Great Depression onward, the Dutch government still hoped for international cooperation to solve the economic crisis. Only after the failed 1933 World Economic Conference, when it became clear that countries had to solve their economic problems by themselves, did the Netherlands increase its trade barriers to a more significant level. But as described earlier the Netherlands was still unwilling to drop the gold standard, and instead joined an agreement between the last European countries to maintain the gold standard. This subjected the Dutch economy to fierce foreign competition, forcing Dutch firms to strongly cut their costs in order to survive this situation. In the process wages and employment were cut, and the depression deepened. While the economic situation gradually improved in most industrialised countries around 1933–1934, the Great Depression was still getting worse in the Netherlands.

== Gradual recovery ==
As in most other affected countries, the end of the Great Depression in the Netherlands was gradual, but in the Netherlands, recovery did not start before 1936, when the country abandoned the gold standard.

== Fall of the gold standard ==
By 1933, only a few European states still remained with the gold standard, while among others the United Kingdom and the United States had abandoned it. By cooperating in international negotiation as a "gold bloc" and lowering trade restrictions among themselves these states tried to survive harsh foreign competition without accepting currency devaluation. Internal trade failed to solve their problems, however, and by 1935 only France, Switzerland and the Netherlands remained in this gold bloc. In the Netherlands the gold standard was supported by prime minister Colijn and his cabinet, as according to them it was the best way to deal with inflation rates. Colijn even went as far as to push for the gold standard at the League of Nations in early 1936.

With France finally deciding to accept devaluation in 1936 and Switzerland announcing their devaluation a day later, the Netherlands had no choice but to follow. While the Netherlands had been so reluctant to drop the gold standard, it quickly brought an economic boost after years of decline. In 1936 the Dutch stock market started climbing again, trade slowly recovered and unemployment stopped growing. Finally the country could now profit from the ongoing economic recovery that had been taking place for many of its trading partners.

== Preamble to World War II ==
In 1937 the short period of economic recovery in the Netherlands stagnated again when the United States suffered its Recession of 1937–38. Another reason for stagnation were the rising political tensions caused by Germany's increasingly aggressive behaviour, causing uncertainty and the withdrawal of capital from European economies. At the same time the effects of the depression became less visible as European states started to rearm themselves in the preamble of World War II. The Netherlands started its rearmament relatively late and imported much of its weaponry, but by 1938 the artificial economic recovery caused by pre-war preparations also had its effects on the Netherlands.

By 1939, large numbers of formerly unemployed people had been drafted into the army, while rising defence expenditure (the budget tripled between 1936 and 1939) artificially revived several sectors of the economy. Right before World War II an event took place which could have been very influential, had it happened earlier. The cabinet led by Hendrik Colijn was succeeded by the De Geer cabinet, which included two members of the Social Democratic Workers' Party (SDAP) for the first time in history. The new cabinet proposed an ambitious strategy to invest large sums of money in public works to finally end the depression. But before this new policy could fully be implemented the Netherlands was dragged into World War II. On 10 May 1940, Germany invaded the Netherlands, and the Dutch economy transformed into a war economy.
