= Jacob Adriaan de Wilde =

Dutch politician (1879–1956)

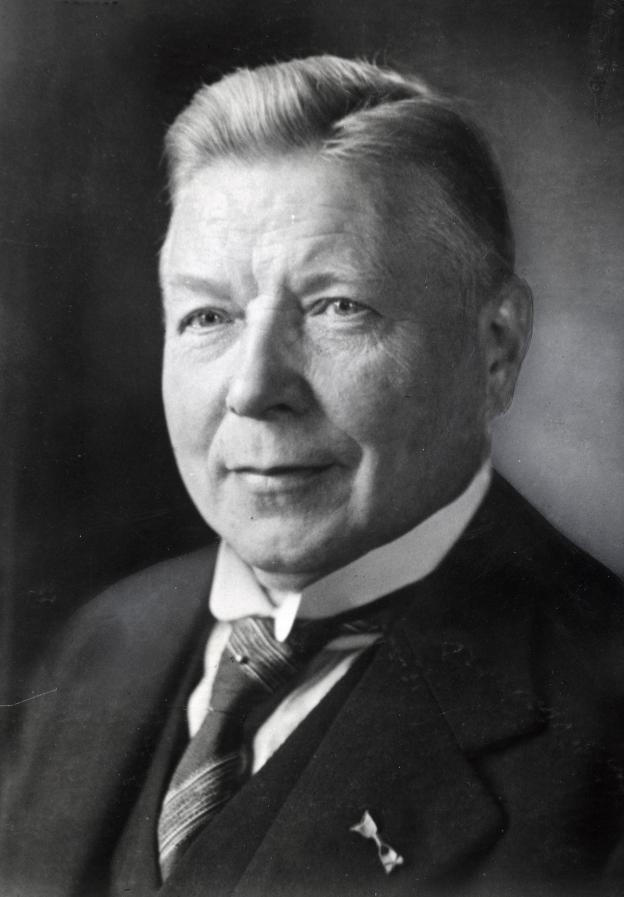
- Jacob Adriaan de Wilde

Member of the Senate
- In office 27 July 1948 – 15 July 1952

Chairman of the Anti-Revolutionary Party
- In office 18 September 1944 – 5 May 1945; Acting
- Leader: Vacant
- Preceded by: Hendrikus Colijn
- Succeeded by: Jan Schouten

Minister of Finance
- In office 24 June 1937 – 19 May 1939
- Prime Minister: Hendrikus Colijn
- Preceded by: Pieter Oud
- Succeeded by: Hendrikus Colijn (ad interim)

Minister of the Interior
- In office 26 May 1933 – 24 June 1937
- Prime Minister: Hendrikus Colijn
- Preceded by: Charles Ruijs de Beerenbrouck
- Succeeded by: Hendrik van Boeijen

Member of the House of Representatives
- In office 19 September 1939 – 27 July 1948
- In office 8 June 1937 – 26 June 1937
- In office 17 September 1918 – 17 May 1933

Personal details
- Born: Jacob Adriaan de Wilde; 7 January 1879 Goes, Netherlands
- Died: 10 January 1956 (aged 77) The Hague, Netherlands
- Party: Anti-Revolutionary Party
- Education: Vrije Universiteit Amsterdam (Bachelor of Letters, Bachelor of Laws); University of Amsterdam (Master of Laws)
- Occupation: Politician · civil servant · jurist · lawyer · prosecutor · editor · author

Jacob Adriaan de Wilde (7 January 1879 – 10 January 1956) was a Dutch politician of the Anti-Revolutionary Party (ARP) and jurist.

De Wilde attended the Gymnasium Haganum in The Hague from June 1891 until June 1897 and applied at the Vrije Universiteit Amsterdam in June 1897, majoring in Law, Literature and Philology and obtaining Bachelor of Letters and Bachelor of Laws degrees in July 1901 before transferring to the University of Amsterdam the next year in July 1902 where he graduated with a Master of Laws degree in July 1905. De Wilde worked as a lawyer from September 1905 until May 1933 in Soest from September 1905 until February 1908 and in The Hague from February 1908 until May 1933. De Wilde also worked as editor of the newspapers Haagsche Courant and the Provinciale Zeeuwse Courant from April 1913 until August 1920 and editor-in-chief of the party newspaper De Rotterdammer from March 1914 until August 1920 and served as editor-in-chief of Haagsche Courant and the Provinciale Zeeuwse Courant from March 1916 until August 1920. De Wilde served on the municipal council of The Hague from September 1916 until September 1931 and served as an alderman of the city from September 1919 until September 1931. De Wilde was elected to the House of Representatives in the 1918 general election, taking office on 17 September 1918. After the 1933 general election, De Wilde was appointed as Minister of the Interior in the Colijn II cabinet, taking office on 26 May 1933. The cabinet fell just two-year later on 23 July 1935 and continued to serve in a demissionary capacity until the cabinet formation of 1935 when it was replaced by the Colijn III cabinet, with De Wilde continuing as minister of the interior, taking office on 31 July 1935. After the 1937 general election, De Wilde returned to the House of Representatives, taking office on 8 June 1937. Following the cabinet formation of 1937, De Wilde was appointment as Minister of Finance in the Colijn IV cabinet, taking office on 24 June 1937. On 19 May 1939 De Wilde resigned after disagreeing with the cabinet's decision to not implement a stronger austerity policy. De Wilde once more returned to the House of Representatives after the resignation of Hendrik Botterweg, taking office on 19 September 1939.

On 10 May 1940 Nazi Germany invaded the Netherlands and the government fled to London to escape the German occupation. During World War II, De Wilde continued to serve as a member of the House of Representatives, but in reality the de facto political influence of the House of Representatives was marginalised. On 30 June 1941, De Wilde was arrested and detained in Vught and was transferred to Kamp Sint-Michielsgestel on 1 December and was detained until 7 May 1942. De Wilde also served retroactively as acting Chairman of the Anti-Revolutionary Party from 18 September 1944 until 5 May 1945 after Hendrikus Colijn had died in captivity in Ilmenau on 18 September 1944. Following the end of World War II, Queen Wilhelmina ordered a Recall of Parliament and De Wilde remained a member of the House of Representatives, taking office on 20 November 1945. De Wilde was elected to the Senate in the 1948 Senate election, he resigned as a member of the House of Representatives the same day he was installed as a member of the Senate, serving from 27 July 1948 until 15 July 1952.

== Decorations ==
Honours
Ribbon bar	Honour	Country	Date	Comment
	Knight of the Order of the Netherlands Lion	Netherlands	30 June 1926	
	Grand Officer of the Order of Orange-Nassau	Netherlands	30 August 1939	

Party political offices
Preceded by Hendrikus Colijn	Chairman of the Anti-Revolutionary Party; Acting; 1944–1945	Succeeded by Jan Schouten
Political offices
Preceded by Charles Ruijs de Beerenbrouck	Minister of the Interior; 1933–1937	Succeeded by Hendrik van Boeijen
Preceded by Pieter Oud	Minister of Finance; 1937–1939	Succeeded by Hendrikus Colijn; Ad interim
