= Louis Domeratzky =

20th-century American economist

Louis Domeratzky (Sept. 10, 1881 in Rajgrod, Poland – Febr. 15, 1967) was an American economist, who for many years worked for the Department of Commerce in Washington, D.C.

== Intellectual and professional life ==
Domaratzky wrote numerous brochures, books and above all articles about foreign trade and foreign economies. These covered topics in a wide range of trade relations, trade practices, trade restrictions, cartels, direct investments, pricing, tariffs, economic policies and individual national economies. The first publication of him is recognizable for 1914, the last for 1943.

Domaratzky worked all his professional life for the US Department of Commerce. He appeared busy and competent and rose on the career ladder: In 1929, he was introduced in a book as "Chief" of the "Division of Regional Information, Bureau of Foreign and Domestic Commerce" being a part of the Commerce Department in Washington, DC.

Domeratzky was a consultant to leading American politicians, so to president Herbert Hoover by a letter of March 10, 1925. Domaratzky initially had been worried about the impact of direct investments on export markets, but then found that both had gone ahead well since World War I. In general, he was an advocate of "our [American] foreign industrial expansion".

== Private life ==
Domeratzky was of Polish origin. He had five brothers and sisters. His family immigrated to the United States in 1897. He lived for many years in McLean, Virginia.

== Bibliography ==
- Foreign import duties on motor vehicles and accessories : revised to November 1914. United States. Bureau of Foreign and Domestic Commerce, Washington : Government Printing Office, 1914. Tariff series, no. 30.
- Tariff Relations Between Germany and Russia (1890–1914), U.S. Department of Commerce, Bureau of Foreign and Domestic Commerce, Tariff Series No. 38 (Washington, DC: GPO, 1918.
- The Continental Steel Cartel. In: Proceedings of the Academy of Political Science in the City of New York 12 (1928), no. 4 (Jan.), p. 96–109.
- The international cartel movement. [Washington, D.C.]: US Gov. Print. Off., 1928. Trade Information Bulletin No. 556.
- The International Cartel as an Influence in Tariff Policies. In: Annals of the American Academy of Political and Social Science 141 (1929), (Jan.), p. 238–242.JSTOR 1017643
- American Industry Abroad, In: Foreign Affairs 8 (1930), July, p. 569–582
- Cartels and the Business Crisis. In: Foreign affairs 10 (1931), no. 1, p. 34–53.
- Price control in Germany : policy and technique. In: Foreign commerce weekly 3 (1941), p. 139-141,146, 184–187.
- The industrial power of the Nazis. In: Foreign affairs 19 (1941), no. 3, p. 641–654.
- German economic policies and the German economists. Washington. 1942).
- German cartels. Their evolution under war conditions. In: Foreign commerce weekly 1943, no. 11 (19 June 1943), p. 9-11, 36–37.
