= Willem Aantjes =

Dutch politician (1923–2015)

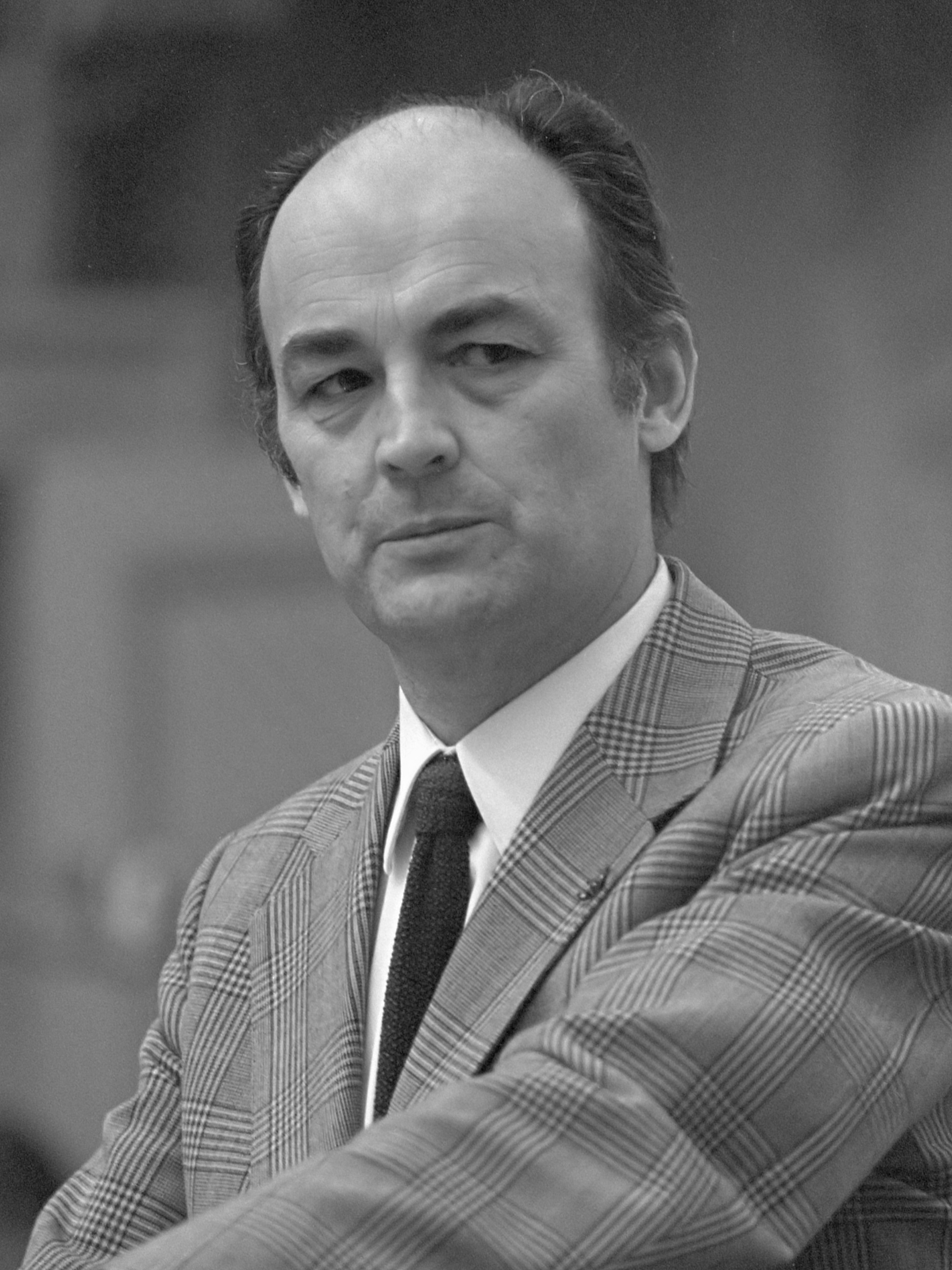
- Willem Aantjes in 1974

Leader of the Anti-Revolutionary Party
- In office 7 March 1973 – 25 May 1977
- Preceded by: Barend Biesheuvel
- Succeeded by: Office discontinued

Parliamentary leader in the House of Representatives
- In office 19 December 1977 – 7 November 1978
- Preceded by: Dries van Agt
- Succeeded by: Ruud Lubbers
- Parliamentary group: Christian Democratic Appeal
- In office 7 March 1973 – 8 June 1977
- Preceded by: Barend Biesheuvel
- Succeeded by: Office discontinued
- In office 6 July 1971 – 7 December 1972
- Preceded by: Barend Biesheuvel
- Succeeded by: Barend Biesheuvel
- Parliamentary group: Anti-Revolutionary Party

Deputy Leader of the Anti-Revolutionary Party
- In office 23 February 1967 – 7 March 1973
- Leader: Barend Biesheuvel
- Preceded by: Bauke Roolvink
- Succeeded by: Gerrit van Dam

Member of the House of Representatives
- In office 26 May 1959 – 7 November 1978
- Parliamentary group: Christian Democratic Appeal (1977–1978); Anti-Revolutionary Party (1959–1977)

Personal details
- Born: Willem Aantjes; 16 January 1923 Bleskensgraaf, Netherlands
- Died: 22 October 2015 (aged 92) Utrecht, Netherlands
- Party: Christian Democratic Appeal (from 1980)
- Other political affiliations: Anti-Revolutionary Party (until 1980)
- Spouses: Gisela Braun (m. 1953; div. 1995) Ineke Ludikhuize (m. 2000)
- Children: 2 sons and 1 daughter
- Education: Utrecht University (Bachelor of Laws, Master of Laws)
- Occupation: Politician · Jurist · Nonprofit director

Willem "Wim" Aantjes (Dutch pronunciation: [ˈʋɪləɱ ʋɪm ˈaːɲtɕəs]; 16 January 1923 – 22 October 2015) was a Dutch politician of the Christian Democratic Appeal (CDA).

A jurist by occupation, Aantjes was elected to the House of Representatives on 26 May 1959 after the general election of 1959. He served as the parliamentary leader of the Anti-Revolutionary Party in the House of Representatives from 22 June 1971 until 30 November 1972, a period during which Barend Biesheuvel (then Leader of the ARP) served as Prime Minister of the Netherlands. Aantjes became Leader of the Anti-Revolutionary Party and parliamentary leader on 7 March 1973, and served until 25 May 1977; he then became the parliamentary leader of the Christian Democratic Appeal in the House of Representatives, serving from 19 December 1977 until 7 November 1978, when he resigned both his positions.

== Biography ==
=== Early life ===
Willem Aantjes was born on 16 January 1923 in Bleskensgraaf, in the province of South Holland. His father, Klaas Aantjes, was an alderman in Bleskensgraaf and from 1 October 1950 to 14 January 1951 served as mayor of Hendrik-Ido-Ambacht. His brother Jan Aantjes also served as mayor of several municipalities. Aantjes attended the Marnix Gymnasium in Rotterdam.

On 8 February 1940, Aantjes began working for the postal mail company PTT. On 19 July 1943, he was selected for Arbeitseinsatz and sent to Güstrow in Germany to deliver mail. Aantjes later explained that he had not refused selection because if he had, the board of PTT would have sent a married employee in his place. In September 1944, Aantjes wanted to return to the Netherlands. Other Dutch forced laborers told him that if he joined the Germanic SS, he could ask for an assignment in the Netherlands and be trained as a police officer on the Avegoor estate near Ellecom. Aantjes decided he would follow this route, and enlisted in the Germanic SS. To his dismay, he was assigned to Landstorm Nederland, a division of the Waffen-SS and he received a uniform. After being transferred to Hoogeveen, Aantjes refused to wear the uniform and to enlist in Landstorm Nederland. He was arrested and imprisoned in Port Natal near Assen, an abandoned psychiatric hospital that had been turned into a work camp by the Nazis.

After the war ended in May 1945, Aantjes enrolled at the University of Utrecht to study law. He never mentioned his enlistment in the Germanic SS to anyone.

=== Politics ===
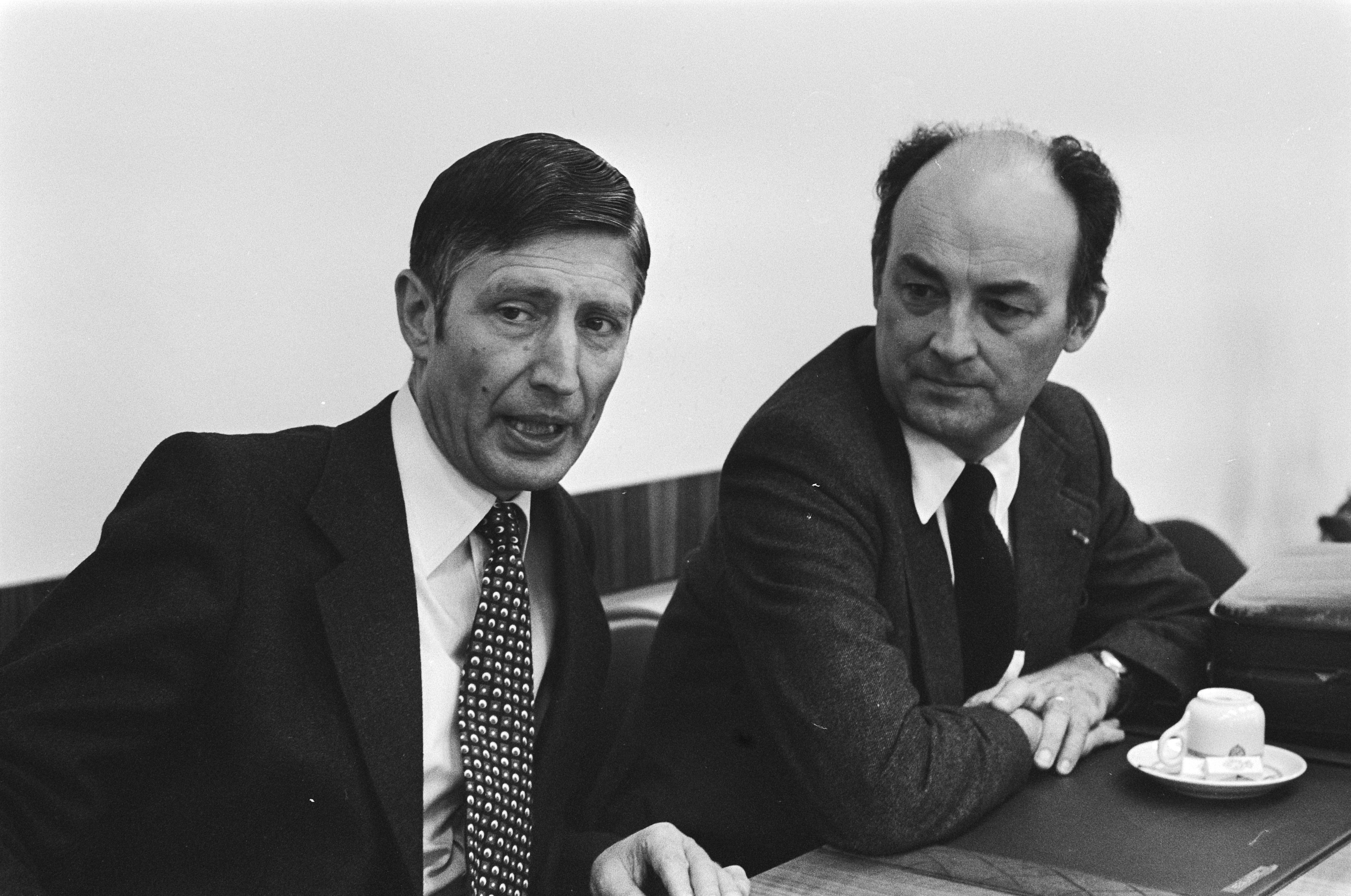
Parliamentary leader of the Christian Democratic Appeal Dries van Agt and Member of the House of Representatives Willem Aantjes on 26 August 1977.

Aantjes became a member of the House of Representatives for the Anti-Revolutionary Party (ARP) in 1959. He was offered the Ministry of Housing, Spatial Planning and the Environment in 1967. He turned it down, because several party members knew enough about his wartime past to object to his candidacy in public. On 6 July 1971, Aantjes became leader of the ARP group.

Aantjes played an important role in the merger of the Anti-Revolutionary Party (ARP), the Christian Historical Union (CHU) and the Catholic People's Party (KVP) into the Christian Democratic Appeal (CDA). His address to the first joint congress of the three parties, which was held in 1975, has become known as the "Sermon on the Mount". After the general election of 1977, Aantjes was offered the Ministry of Justice in the first cabinet of Prime Minister Dries van Agt. Again, Aantjes refused, and used his continuing involvement in the development of the CDA party as reason for his refusal. He then became the first leader of the CDA party in the House of Representatives on 20 December 1977.

=== World War II controversy and resignation ===
In 1978, Loe de Jong of the Dutch Institute for War Documentation was confronted with stories about Aantjes's alleged sympathies for Nazism. Although the Institute usually did not respond to such rumors, De Jong – considering the high position of Aantjes – believed that further investigation was necessary. His staff discovered a note, which showed that Aantjes was mobilized in October 1944 as part of the Waffen-SS. On 6 November 1978, De Jong announced in a press conference that Aantjes had signed up for the Waffen-SS in World War II, and that he had been a camp guard in Port Natal. Aantjes, at that time leader of the CDA party in the House of Representatives, resigned his position as parliamentary party leader and member of the House of Representatives the next day. Aantjes argued he had joined the Germanic SS because he believed that this was the only legal way to escape from forced labor in Güstrow. While De Jong assumed that Aantjes had joined the Germanic SS out of mere opportunism or sympathy for the Nazi ideology or the National Socialist Movement in the Netherlands, Aantjes said this was not the case.

A later investigation showed that Aantjes was right and had instead been interned at Port Natal, and De Jong admitted to having made a mistake. The affair was publicly seen as a way for Aantjes' political rivals to get rid of him.

=== Death ===
Aantjes died on 22 October 2015 in the city of Utrecht, Utrecht province, Netherlands.

== Decorations ==
Honours
Ribbon bar	Honour	Country	Date
	Knight of the Order of the Netherlands Lion	Netherlands	29 April 1970

Party political offices
Preceded by Barend Biesheuvel	Parliamentary leader of the Anti-Revolutionary Party in the House of Representatives; 1971–1972; 1973–1977	Succeeded by Barend Biesheuvel
Preceded by Barend Biesheuvel	Parliamentary leader of the Anti-Revolutionary Party in the House of Representatives; 1971–1972; 1973–1977	Succeeded by Office discontinued
Preceded by Barend Biesheuvel	Leader of the Anti-Revolutionary Party; 1971–1982	Succeeded by Office discontinued
Preceded by Dries van Agt	Parliamentary leader of the Christian Democratic Appeal in the House of Representatives; 1977–1978	Succeeded by Ruud Lubbers
