= De Standaard (Netherlands) =

Dutch daily newspaper (published 1872-1944)

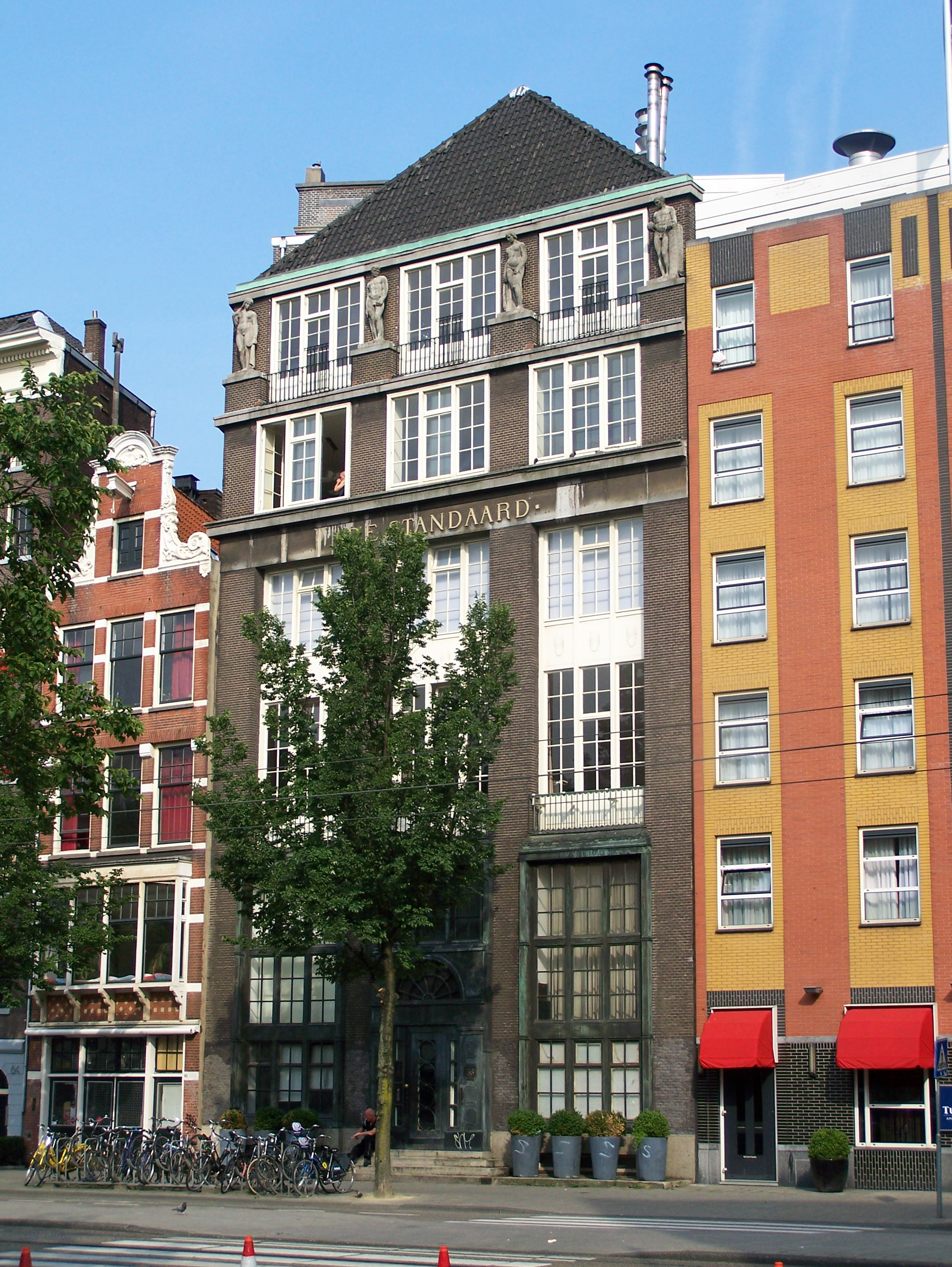
Former building of the newspaper

De Standaard was a Dutch daily newspaper published from 1872 to 1944. It was started by Abraham Kuyper, who was the founding editor, and served as an organ of the Anti-Revolutionary Party. Hendrikus Colijn served as editor from 1922 to 1939.

In World War II, De Standaard took a neutral view toward the German occupation and was permitted to continue publication. Trouw appeared in 1943 as an illegal competitor, and De Standaard ceased publication in 1944 due to paper shortages.
