= Victor Rutgers =

Dutch legal scholar and politician (1877–1945)

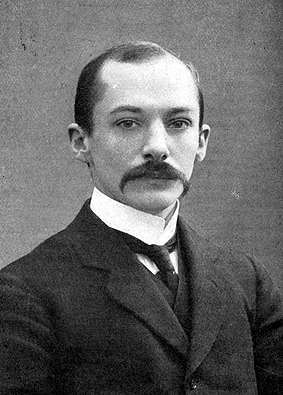
- Rutgers, c. 1913

Minister of Education, Arts and Sciences
- In office 4 August 1925 – 8 March 1926
- Cabinet: Colijn I
- Preceded by: Johannes Theodoor de Visser
- Succeeded by: Marius Waszink

Member of the House of Representatives
- In office 20 February 1912 – 5 August 1925
- Constituency: Hilversum

Member of the Provincial Executive of South Holland
- In office July 1919 – August 1925

Mayor of Boskoop
- In office May 1915 – June 1919

Personal details
- Born: Victor Henri Rutgers; 16 December 1877 's-Hertogenbosch, Netherlands
- Died: 5 February 1945 (aged 67) Bochum, Germany
- Party: Anti-Revolutionary Party
- Education: University of Amsterdam
- Occupation: Legal scholar; politician

Victor Henri Rutgers (Dutch: [ˈvɪktɔrˈrʏtxərs]; 16 December 1877 – 5 February 1945) was a Dutch legal scholar and politician of the Anti-Revolutionary Party (ARP).

== Life ==
Born in 's-Hertogenbosch in 1877, he received his law degree from the University of Amsterdam. He started his career as an attorney in Amsterdam and Hilversum, and he sat on the Hilversum Municipal Council and the Provincial Council of North Holland. He was first elected to the House of Representatives in 1912, and he was the ARP's parliamentary leader between 1919 and 1925 with a one-year interruption. Simultaneously, Rutgers served as mayor of Boskoop and member of the Provincial Executive of South Holland. Rutgers was Minister of Education, Arts and Sciences in the short-lived first Colijn cabinet from August 1925 until March 1926.

He became a member of the Provincial Council of South Holland, and he worked as a professor at Vrije Universiteit Amsterdam, where he specialised in Roman and criminal law, starting in 1928. He represented the Netherlands in conferences and committees of the League of Nations, and he was on the Amsterdam Municipal Council for less than a year. Rutgers joined the Dutch resistance in World War II, and he died in 1945 in German captivity in Bochum, Germany.

Political offices
Preceded by Johannes Theodoor de Visser	Minister of Education, Arts and Sciences; 1925–1926	Succeeded by Marius Waszink
