= Jacob Adriaan Patijn =

Dutch politician (1873–1961)

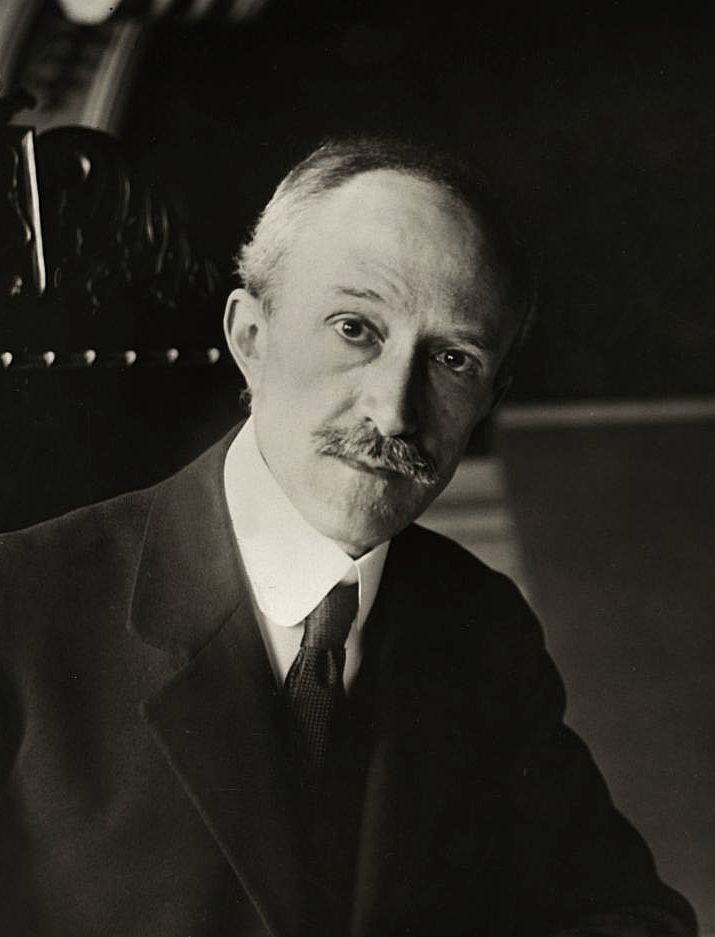
J.A.N. Patijn (in 1918).

Jacob Adriaan Nicolaas Patijn (9 February 1873 in Rotterdam – 13 July 1961 in The Hague) was an unaffiliated liberal Dutch politician who was Minister of Foreign Affairs from October 1, 1937, until August 12, 1939.

== Family ==
J.A.N. Patijn was a member of the Patijn family which provided numerous politicians to the Netherlands. He was a son of Jacob Gerard Patijn, lawyer and politician, and Adriana Jacoba Clasina Veeren. In 1903 he married Rudolphine van Doorn (1880–1923) and, after her death at a relatively young age, remarried Elisabeth Wilhelmina Malwina de Brauw (1881–1954). From both marriages no child was born.

== Career ==
J.A.N. Patijn started his career in diplomacy and then became a civil servant. He was mayor of Leeuwarden from 1 October 1911 to 1918, where he was also deputy judge of the district court from 1912 to 1918.

He then became mayor of The Hague from September 1918 until 1930.

In 1931 he became the Dutch envoy in the Italy of Mussolini, whom he admired for some time. In 1936 he became envoy in Brussels.

Patijn also had great admiration for Hendrikus Colijn. He replaced him in 1937 as Minister of Foreign Affairs, three months after the formation of Cabinet Colijn IV, and remained in the same position in Cabinet Colijn V. So he was Minister of Foreign Affairs from October 1, 1937, until August 12, 1939.

Even though he was not a member of the parties which had come together in the government coalition (RKSP, ARP and CHU), he was attracted, as a member of the Dutch Oxford group, to the strong Christian signature of this coalition.

As a minister he showed little respect for parliament. He was a pragmatist who strived to find workable solutions to the day's problems, be it at the expense of old principles. He was also known to be rather stubborn and authoritarian.

His interest in arts, literature and music was notorious.

== Legacy ==
An avenue is named after him in The Hague. It is one of the longest there as it has the highest house number of the whole city, nr 1938. Another avenue is named after him in Zeist.

Diplomatic posts
Preceded by Hendrikus Colijn	Minister of Foreign Affairs; 1937–1939	Succeeded by Eelco van Kleffens
