= Hendrikus Colijn =

Dutch politician (1869–1944)

His Excellency Hendrikus Colijn
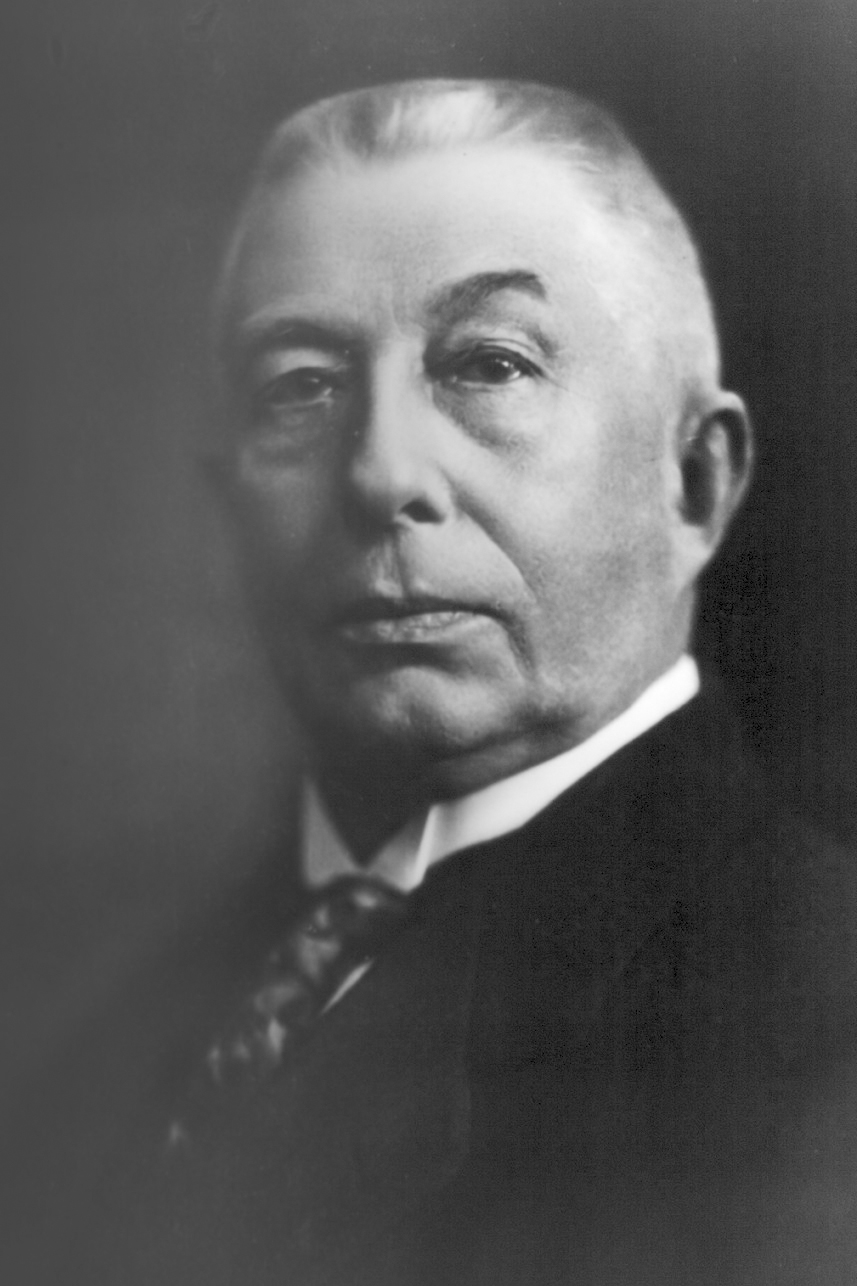
- Colijn in 1925

Chairman of the Council of Ministers
- In office 26 May 1933 – 10 August 1939
- Monarch: Wilhelmina
- Preceded by: Charles Ruijs de Beerenbrouck
- Succeeded by: Dirk Jan de Geer
- In office 4 August 1925 – 8 March 1926
- Monarch: Wilhelmina
- Preceded by: Charles Ruijs de Beerenbrouck
- Succeeded by: Dirk Jan de Geer

Minister of Foreign Affairs
- In office 24 June 1937 – 1 October 1937; Ad interim
- Prime Minister: himself
- Preceded by: Andries Cornelis Dirk de Graeff
- Succeeded by: Jacob Adriaan Nicolaas Patijn

Minister of Defence
- In office 2 September 1935 – 24 June 1937
- Prime Minister: himself
- Preceded by: Laurentius Nicolaas Deckers
- Succeeded by: Jannes van Dijk

Minister of Water Management
- In office 13 January 1935 – 15 March 1935; Ad interim
- Prime Minister: himself
- Preceded by: Jacob Kalff
- Succeeded by: Otto van Lidth de Jeude

Minister of Economic Affairs
- In office 25 July 1939 – 10 August 1939
- Prime Minister: himself
- Preceded by: Max Steenberghe
- Succeeded by: Max Steenberghe
- In office 17 April 1934 – 25 June 1934; Ad interim
- Prime Minister: himself
- Preceded by: Timotheus Verschuur
- Succeeded by: Max Steenberghe

Minister of Colonial Affairs
- In office 26 May 1933 – 24 June 1937
- Prime Minister: himself
- Preceded by: Simon de Graaff
- Succeeded by: Charles Welter
- In office 4 August 1925 – 1 October 1925; Ad interim
- Prime Minister: himself
- Preceded by: Simon de Graaff
- Succeeded by: Charles Welter

Minister of Finance
- In office 19 May 1939 – 25 July 1939; Ad interim
- Prime Minister: himself
- Preceded by: Jacob Adriaan de Wilde
- Succeeded by: Christiaan Bodenhausen
- In office 11 August 1923 – 8 March 1926
- Prime Minister: Charles Ruijs de Beerenbrouck (1923–1925); Hendrikus Colijn (1925–1926)
- Preceded by: Dirk Jan de Geer
- Succeeded by: Dirk Jan de Geer

Leader of the Anti-Revolutionary Party
- In office 31 March 1920 – 18 September 1944
- Preceded by: Abraham Kuyper
- Succeeded by: Jan Schouten

Chairman of the Anti-Revolutionary Party
- In office 6 September 1939 – 18 September 1944
- Leader: himself
- Preceded by: Jan Schouten
- Succeeded by: Jan Schouten (1945)
- In office 31 March 1920 – 26 May 1933
- Leader: himself
- Preceded by: Abraham Kuyper
- Succeeded by: Jan Schouten

Minister of the Navy
- In office 14 May 1912 – 29 August 1913
- Prime Minister: Theo Heemskerk
- Preceded by: Jan Wentholt
- Succeeded by: Jean Jacques Rambonnet

Minister of War
- In office 4 January 1911 – 29 August 1913
- Prime Minister: Theo Heemskerk
- Preceded by: Wouter Cool
- Succeeded by: Nicolaas Bosboom
Parliament
Parliamentary leader in the Senate
In office 23 September 1926 – 17 September 1929
Preceded by	Anne Anema
Succeeded by	Anne Anema
Parliamentary group	Anti-Revolutionary Party
Member of the Senate
In office 31 October 1939 – 18 September 1944
In office 23 September 1926 – 21 August 1929
In office 15 September 1914 – 10 November 1920
Parliamentary group	Anti-Revolutionary Party
Parliamentary leader in the House of Representatives
In office 17 September 1929 – 23 May 1933
Preceded by	Theo Heemskerk
Succeeded by	Jan Schouten
In office 11 July 1922 – 11 August 1923
Preceded by	Victor Rutgers
Succeeded by	Victor Rutgers
Parliamentary group	Anti-Revolutionary Party
Member of the House of Representatives
In office 8 June 1937 – 25 June 1937
In office 17 September 1929 – 26 May 1933
In office 25 July 1922 – 15 August 1923
In office 9 November 1909 – 4 January 1911
Parliamentary group	Anti-Revolutionary Party

Personal details
- Born: 22 June 1869 Burgerveen, Netherlands
- Died: 18 September 1944 (aged 75) Ilmenau, Germany
- Party: Anti-Revolutionary Party
- Spouse: Helena Groenenberg (m. 1893)
- Relations: Arie Colijn (brother)
- Children: 3, including Anton Colijn
- Education: Royal Military Academy
- Occupation: Politician · Civil servant · Military officer · Teacher · Editor-in-chief · Businessman · Corporate director

Military service
- Allegiance: Netherlands
- Branch/service: Royal Netherlands East Indies Army
- Years of service: 1886–1909
- Rank: Major

Hendrikus "Hendrik" Colijn (22 June 1869 – 18 September 1944) was a Dutch politician of the Anti-Revolutionary Party (ARP; now defunct and merged into the Christian Democratic Appeal or CDA). He served as Prime Minister of the Netherlands from 4 August 1925 until 8 March 1926, and from 26 May 1933 until 10 August 1939.

== Early life ==
Colijn was born on 22 June 1869 in the Haarlemmermeer to Antonie Colijn and Anna Verkuijl, who had migrated to the newly created Haarlemmermeer polder from the Land of Heusden and Altena for religious reasons. He was the first of six children, all of whom were born in Haarlemmermeer. Colijn grew up in the Land of Altena.

== Military service ==
At the age of 16, Colijn went to a military academy in Kampen for officer training, where he graduated as a second lieutenant in 1892. On 18 September 1893, he married Helena Groenenberg (23 September 1867 – 14 February 1947) and was sent to the Dutch East Indies. During his 16 years in the Dutch East Indies, he spent ten years in the colonial army. He served in the Aceh War as the lieutenant of J. B. van Heutsz and six further years in the colonial administration as a lieutenant when van Heutsz became Governor General in 1904.

Colijn's letters to his wife from his period on Lombok reveal that his participation in acts of brutality which by modern standards would be considered severe war crimes:

I have seen a mother carrying a child of about 6 months old on her left arm, with a long lance in her right hand, who was running in our direction. One of our bullets killed the mother as well as the child. From now on we couldn't give any mercy, it was over. I did give orders to gather a group of 9 women and 3 children who asked for mercy and they were shot all together. It was not a pleasant job, but something else was impossible. Our soldiers tacked them with pleasure with their bayonets. It was horrible. I will stop reporting now.

== Early political career ==
After his return to the Netherlands in 1909, Colijn was elected as an Anti-Revolutionary Party Member of Parliament for the district of Sneek (before 1918, the Dutch voting system was the same as the British).

In 1911, he was appointed Minister of War and revised the Dutch Selective Service System. In May 1918, he acted as an intermediary between the British and Kaiser Wilhelm II of Germany to arrange an armistice, resulting in the Wilhelm gaining refuge in the Netherlands.

== Business life ==
In 1910, the Holland Dakota Landbouw Compagnie was established, with Hendrikus Colijn and his brother Arie Colijn as the primary shareholders.

From 1914 to 1922, he served as CEO for the Bataafse Petroleum Maatschappij (BPM). In 1925, he also became CEO of Royal Dutch Shell.

Colijn served as editor of De Standaard from 1922 to 1939.

== Prime Minister ==
In 1922, Colijn accepted the political leadership of the Anti-Revolutionary Party (Calvinist) from Abraham Kuyper. Only one year later, he succeeded the resigning Dirk Jan de Geer as Minister of Finance. On 4 August 1925, Colijn formed a government as Chairman of the Council of Ministers (now prime minister), but seven months later, on 8 March 1926, he had to step down when the House of Representatives accepted a resolution by Gerrit Hendrik Kersten of the Protestant Reformed Political Party that called for diplomatic mission to the Holy See to be recalled. That was unacceptable to the Roman Catholic State Party, which was then in government. Colijn then returned to the Senate and from 1927 to 1929 served as head of the Dutch delegation to the League of Nations in Geneva. At the election of 1929, he was elected for the House of Representatives, and he immediately became parliamentary leader of his party. That proved to be a success since at the election of 1933, the ARP gained two seats, and Colijn became prime minister again.

From 1933 to 1939, Colijn served four more times as prime minister. During the 1930s, his government faced the effects of the Great Depression, which took a heavy toll on the Netherlands. Colijn's government responded to the economic crisis with a strict protectionist policy, which continued to weaken the Dutch economy. Colijn's decision to adhere to the gold standard until 1936, long after most of the trading partners of the Netherlands had dropped it, was very unpopular with those in favour of government fiat money.

In 1939, Colijn's last cabinet, with Protestant and liberal ministers but without Catholic ministers, lasted only three days before a government crisis. He resigned as prime minister on 10 August, only three weeks before the outbreak of World War II.

== World War II and death ==
After the Dutch defeat in the Battle of the Netherlands in 1940, Colijn published an essay entitled "On the Border of Two Worlds" (Op de Grens van Twee Werelden) in which he called for accepting German leadership in Europe immediately after the Royal House had fled to England and left him behind. His view was influenced by the tremendous show of force that the German blitzkrieg had shown and the relative weakness of the Allied forces. Soon thereafter, he tried to organize political resistance but was arrested in June 1941 and taken to Berlin for interrogation. The Germans tried to have him confess that he had conspired with the British to invade the Netherlands to serve as an excuse for the German invasion.

Late in the war, according to a grandson, after the tide had turned against the Germans, Heinrich Himmler wanted to keep Colijn available as a possible intermediary with the British, as he had done earlier for Wilhelm II. The very fact that the Gestapo allowed the visit suggests that Himmler was already making contingency plans in case of a German loss. In March 1943, Colijn was put under house arrest in a remote mountain hotel in Ilmenau, where he died on 18 September 1944.

== Decorations ==
Honours
Ribbon bar	Honour	Country	Date	Comment
	Knight 3rd Class of the Military Order of William	Netherlands	1 August 1895	Style of Excellency
	Knight Grand Cross of the Order of Orange-Nassau	Netherlands	12 March 1926	Elevated from Grand Officer (5 September 1913)
	Knight Grand Cross of the Order of the Netherlands Lion	Netherlands	31 August 1929	Elevated from Commander (11 August 1923)

Honorific Titles
Ribbon bar	Honour	Country	Date	Comment
	Minister of State	Netherlands	31 August 1929	Style of Excellency

House of Representatives of the Netherlands
Preceded by Hendrik Pollema	Member for Sneek; 1909–1911	Succeeded by Jan Gerrit Scheurer

Party political offices
Preceded by Abraham Kuyper	Leader of the Anti-Revolutionary Party; 1920–1944	Succeeded by Jan Schouten
Preceded by Abraham Kuyper	Chairman of the Anti-Revolutionary Party; 1920–1933; 1939–1944	Succeeded by Jan Schouten
Preceded by Jan Schouten	Chairman of the Anti-Revolutionary Party; 1920–1933; 1939–1944	Succeeded by Jan Schouten
Preceded by Victor Henri Rutgers	Parliamentary leader of the Anti-Revolutionary Party in the House of Representatives; 1922–1923; 1929–1933	Succeeded by Victor Henri Rutgers
Preceded by Theo Heemskerk	Parliamentary leader of the Anti-Revolutionary Party in the House of Representatives; 1922–1923; 1929–1933	Succeeded by Jan Schouten
Preceded by Anne Anema	Parliamentary leader of the Anti-Revolutionary Party in the Senate; 1926–1929	Succeeded by Anne Anema

Political offices
Preceded by Wouter Cool	Minister of War; 1911–1913	Succeeded by Nicolaas Bosboom
Preceded by Jan Wentholt	Minister of the Navy; 1912–1913	Succeeded by Jean Jacques; Rambonnet
Preceded by Dirk Jan de Geer	Minister of Finance; 1923–1926; 1939; Ad interim	Succeeded by Dirk Jan de Geer
Preceded by Jacob Adriaan de Wilde	Minister of Finance; 1923–1926; 1939; Ad interim	Succeeded by Christiaan Bodenhausen
Preceded by Charles Ruijs de Beerenbrouck	Prime Minister of the Netherlands; 1925–1926; 1933–1939	Succeeded by Dirk Jan de Geer
Preceded by Charles Ruijs de Beerenbrouck	Prime Minister of the Netherlands; 1925–1926; 1933–1939	Succeeded by Dirk Jan de Geer
Preceded by Simon de Graaff	Minister of Colonial Affairs; 1925; Ad interim 1933–1937	Succeeded by Charles Welter
Preceded by Simon de Graaff	Minister of Colonial Affairs; 1925; Ad interim 1933–1937	Succeeded by Charles Welter
Preceded by Timotheus Verschuur	Minister of Economic Affairs; 1934; Ad interim 1939	Succeeded by Max Steenberghe
Preceded by Max Steenberghe	Minister of Economic Affairs; 1934; Ad interim 1939	Succeeded by Max Steenberghe
Preceded by Jacob Kalff	Minister of Water Management; 1935; Ad interim	Succeeded by Otto van Lidth de Jeude
Preceded by Laurentius; Nicolaas Deckers	Minister of Defence; 1935–1937	Succeeded by Jannes van Dijk
Preceded by Andries Cornelis; Dirk de Graeff	Minister of Foreign Affairs; 1937; Ad interim	Succeeded by Jacob Adriaan; Nicolaas Patijn
