= Otto van Lidth de Jeude =

Dutch politician (1881–1952)

His Excellency Jonkheer Otto van Lidth de Jeude
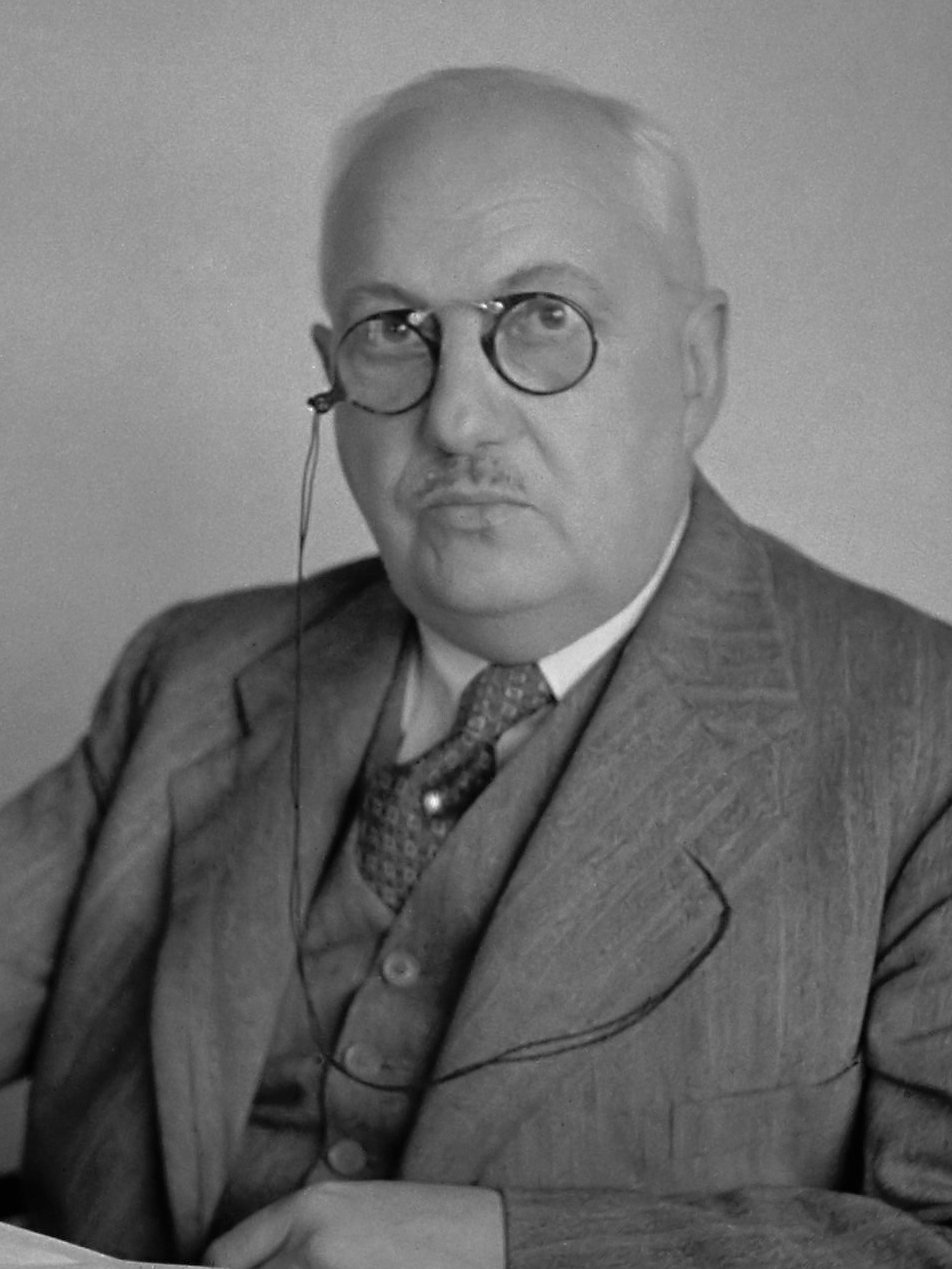
- Otto van Lidth de Jeude in 1942

Minister of War
- In office 15 September 1942 – 23 February 1945
- Prime Minister: Pieter Sjoerds Gerbrandy
- Preceded by: Hendrik van Boeijen
- Succeeded by: Jim de Booy (ad interim)

Member of the House of Representatives
- In office 8 June 1937 – 25 July 1939

Minister of Water Management
- In office 25 July 1939 – 10 August 1939
- Prime Minister: Hendrikus Colijn
- Preceded by: Johan van Buuren
- Succeeded by: Willem Albarda
- In office 15 March 1935 – 24 June 1937
- Prime Minister: Hendrikus Colijn
- Preceded by: Hendrikus Colijn (ad interim)
- Succeeded by: Johan van Buuren

Personal details
- Born: Otto Cornelis Adriaan van Lidth de Jeude; 7 July 1881 Tiel, Netherlands
- Died: 1 February 1952 (aged 70) The Hague, Netherlands
- Party: People's Party for Freedom and Democracy (from 1948)
- Other political affiliations: Freedom Party (1946–1948); Liberal State Party (until 1946)
- Spouse: Dina van Rossem (m. 1908)
- Children: 1 son and 1 daughter
- Education: Institute of Technology (BEng, MEng)
- Occupation: politician; civil servant; civil engineer; businessman

Jonkheer Otto Cornelis Adriaan van Lidth de Jeude (7 July 1881 – 1 February 1952) was a Dutch politician of the Liberal State Party (LSP) and a hydraulic engineer.

== Career ==
Van Lidth de Jeude, a member of the Van Lidth de Jeude family, completed his secondary education at the HBS (Dutch secondary school) in Tiel, where he obtained his diploma in 1898. He then studied at the Polytechnic School in Delft. After graduating in 1903, he joined the Rijkswaterstaat (Dutch Directorate General for Public Works and Water Management). From 1904 to 1910, he worked on the 's-Hertogenbosch-Drongelen drainage canal. From 1910 to 1913, he worked at the 2nd River District in Utrecht. During this time, he also advised on the design for a port on Curaçao. In 1913, he was approached by the Nederlandsche Maatschappij voor Havenwerken (NMvH). For this company, he provided advice on the port works in Chefoo (Yantai, China). He was subsequently asked to supervise the execution. In 1919, he resigned from Rijkswaterstaat and became director of the NMvH, succeeding engineer Lamminga. He established an agency of this company in Bandung for work in the Dutch East Indies. For instance, in 1921, he produced an analysis of the port of Benkoelen (Bengkulu on Sumatra) for the Government. The content of this 37-page report containing 9 maps was not well received, and there was some discussion regarding the fee. The quote was ƒ2,500, the invoice was ƒ6,463, and ultimately ƒ4,463 was paid after the exchange of 37 documents.

In 1927, he created a design for the port of Las Palmas on Gran Canaria and, together with engineer W.C. Köhler (of the Public Works Department in Amsterdam), created a design for a free port of Barcelona. Together with engineer Stigter, he designed a port in the Gulf of Pechili (the Bohai Sea in China), which could not be built due to the outbreak of the Sino-Japanese War of 1933. He resigned as director in 1935 due to his appointment as minister.

Apart from his foreign work for the NMvH, he also concerned himself with Dutch hydraulic engineering problems, such as the waterway from Amsterdam to the Rhine (particularly the crossing of the canal with the Lower Rhine is a problem).

== Political career ==
From 1923 to 1935 he was a member of the Baarn municipal council for De Vrijheidsbond (Duch political party).In 1935 he became Minister of Water Management in the Colijn II Cabinet; he also held this position in the Colijn III Cabinet. After his resignation, he became a member of the House of Representatives for the Liberal State Party (LSP). In 1938 he became chairman of the Wieringermeer Council and in 1939 he again became Minister of Water Management in the Colijn V Cabinet, which lasted only a few weeks. In the late 1930s, Van Lidth de Jeude was a member of both the Board of Directors and the Executive Board at the Colonial Institute, the present-day Royal Tropical Institute. Before the Second World War, he was also the president of the Royal Institute of Engineers.

During the Second World War, he resided in London, where he became chairman of the London committee of the Dutch Red Cross. In that capacity, he was responsible for the reception of refugees from occupied territory. From 1942 to 1945, he served as Minister of War in the Gerbrandy II Cabinet. He resisted Queen Wilhelmina's urgent wish that her son-in-law, Prince Bernhard, become Commander-in-Chief of the Armed Forces after the liberation.

Jhr. ir. O.C.A. van Lidth de Jeude became known partly through the later published diaries that shed light on the Queen and the government in exile in London during the Second World War.

After the war, he held management positions at several organisations and companies.

He married Dina Cornelia van Rossum in Amsterdam on April 16, 1908.

== Decorations ==
Honours
Ribbon bar	Honour	Country	Date	Comment
	Knight of the Order of the Netherlands Lion	Netherlands	30 April 1949	
Awards
Ribbon bar	Awards	Organization	Date	Comment
	Nansen Refugee Award	United Nations	1956	Posthumously
	Wateler Peace Prize	Carnegie Foundation	1956	Posthumously

Political offices
Preceded by Hendrikus Colijn; Ad interim	Minister of Water Management; 1935–1937; 1939	Succeeded by Johan van Buuren
Preceded by Johan van Buuren	Minister of Water Management; 1935–1937; 1939	Succeeded by Willem Albarda
Preceded by Hendrik van Boeijen	Minister of War; 1942–1945	Succeeded by Jim de Booy; Ad interim
