= Jan Schouten (politician) =

Dutch politician (1883-1963

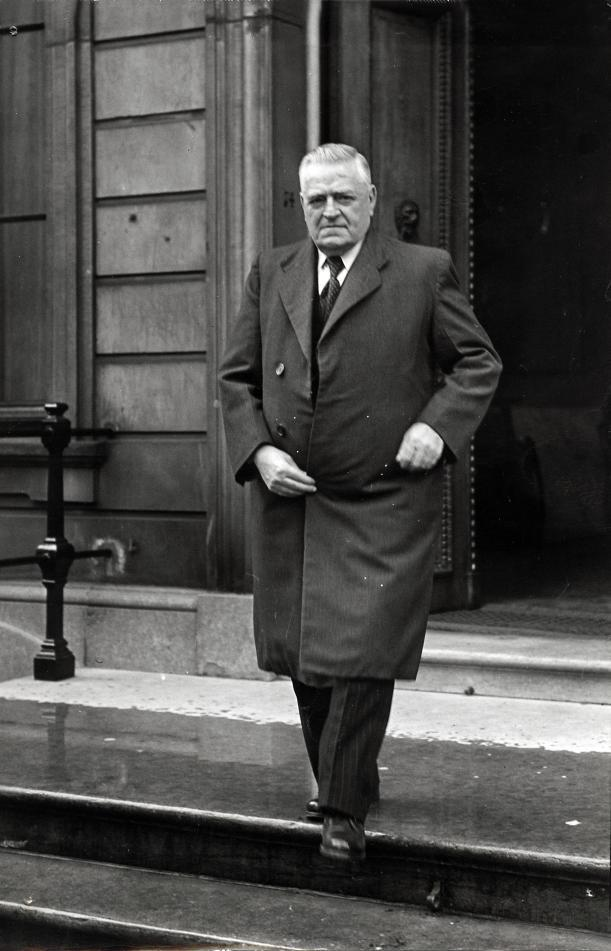
- Jan Schouten in 1955

Member of the House of Representatives
- In office 22 October 1918 – 3 July 1956

Member of the Provincial Council of South Holland
- In office 24 October 1917 – 4 July 1939

Personal details
- Born: Johannes Schouten; 12 August 1883 Maassluis, Netherlands
- Died: 9 September 1963 (aged 80) Rotterdam, Netherlands
- Party: ARP

Johannes "Jan" Schouten (12 August 1883 – 9 September 1963) was a Dutch politician and resistance fighter. Between 1918 and 1956, Schouten was a member of the Dutch Member of the House of Representatives for the Anti-Revolutionary Party (ARP), serving as the ARP's parliamentary leader from 1933 to 1956 and as the ARP's political leader from 1941 to 1956. Together with Abraham Kuyper and Hendrikus Colijn, he is seen as one of the most prominent historical leaders of the ARP.

== Early life ==
Jan Schouten was born on 12 August 1883 in Maassluis into a family of 11 children, the son of Dirk Schouten, a ship captain, and Johanna Schep. Schouten initially intended to follow his father into the shipping business, but after a trip marked by storms he decided to become a florist, working for his uncle Nicolai's firm while simultaneously following an accounting course. At a young age, Schouten became involved in politics through the youth league of the Anti-Revolutionary Party (ARP) and other Reformed youth groups.

== Political career ==
In 1916, Schouten was elected to the municipal council of Rotterdam, a position in which he would serve until 1931. He served as alderman of Rotterdam, responsible for finance, from 1925 to 1927, when he was forced to resign due to a vote of no-confidence after he had proposed cuts to the pensions of municipal workers. He was also elected to the Provincial Council of South Holland in 1917, in which Schouten served until 1939.

Schouten was first elected to the House of Representatives in 1918, after having been defeated in the 1917 Dutch general election by Arie de Zeeuw in Rotterdam's second electoral district. As an MP, he was the ARP's spokesperson on economic affairs, and later on colonial affairs and finance. In 1919, Schouten was one of the few members of the ARP to support a law allowing for women's suffrage, but abstained from voting on the proposal.

In 1933, Schouten became the ARP's parliamentary leader in the House of Representatives. During this period, Schouten was an advocate for closer cooperation between the ARP and other Christian parties, in opposition to Prime Minister Hendrikus Colijn's desire to work more closely with liberal political parties.

== World War II ==
During World War II, Schouten played an important part in setting up an underground ARP party apparatus, allowing the party to continue operating underground during the German occupation. In 1942, Schouten was imprisoned for 6 months in Amersfoort concentration camp for his outspoken anti-German opinions, but was released in December 1942. In January 1943, Schouten was one of the founders of the underground newspaper Trouw, a title which he had thought of, and wrote its first leading article in which he called for loyalty to the Netherlands, entrusted to the Dutch people by God. Schouten was eventually arrested, and spent time imprisoned in Sachsenhausen and Mauthausen concentration camps. Upon his return from Mauthausen in 1945, Schouten is said to have stated to Queen Wilhelmina "I have not changed." (Ik ben niet veranderd).

== ARP leader (1945-1956) ==
After the end of World War II, Schouten became the chairperson of the ARP in 1945. His role in the Dutch resistance and principled anti-German stance within this period, as well as Schouten's personal cultivation of younger members in the ARP significantly increased his prestige and his political position. He opposed both the progressive Doorbraak as well as efforts to have the ARP merged with the Christian Historical Union (CHU) to create a larger Christian people's party. Schouten was a staunch opponent of Indonesian independence, labeling the earliest signs of unrest in August 1945 as the work of a small youthful minority brainwashed by the Japanese. When the Indonesian War of Independence began, Schouten's ARP saw it, in the tradition of Romans 13 and the works of Guillaume Groen van Prinsterer as an unlawful revolution against the divinely-ordained Dutch authority. Under Schouten, the ARP remained strongly opposed to decolonization, and after fellow ARP politician and Trouw head editor Sieuwert Bruins Slot supported handing over Dutch New Guinea to Indonesia in 1962 it cost him his friendship with Schouten.

After the early 1950s, Schouten's power gradually declined. Schouten's leadership faced the accusation that he failed to modernize the ARP and its ideology from the 1930s. He opposed the ARP joining the Second Drees cabinet led by the Labour Party (PvdA), mainly due to the new government's policy on Dutch New Guinea, but was overruled by his colleagues. This led to further criticism from the ARP's right wing, which accused Schouten of being unable to prevent the cooperation with the PvdA, or even being actively complicit. On 22 May 1955, Schouten announced that he would step down as party chair, resigning as political leader of the ARP in April 1956, and leaving the House of Representatives a few months later.

== Later life ==
In 1956, Schouten was appointed to the Council of State, which he was a member of until 1958.

Jan Schouten died on 9 September 1963 in Rotterdam.

== Bibliography ==
- de Jong, Louis (1974), Het Koninkrijk der Nederlanden in de Tweede Wereldoorlog. Deel 5: Maart '41 - juli '42, 's-Gravenhage: M. Nijhoff, ISBN 978-90-247-1641-8
- de Jong, Louis (1975), Het Koninkrijk der Nederlanden in de Tweede Wereldoorlog. Deel 6: Juli '42 - mei '43, 's-Gravenhage: M. Nijhoff, ISBN 978-9012005029
