= Trade restriction =

Policies intended to restrict trade between two countries

A trade restriction is an artificial restriction on the trade of goods and/or services between two or more countries. It is the byproduct of protectionism. However, the term is controversial because what one part may see as a trade restriction another may see as a way to protect consumers from inferior, harmful or dangerous products.

== Examples ==
=== German purity laws: Beer ===
Germany required the production of beer to adhere to its purity law. The law, originally implemented in Bavaria in 1516 and eventually becoming law for newly unified Germany in 1871, made many foreign beers unable to be sold in Germany as "beer". This law was struck down in 1987 by the European Court of Justice, but is still voluntarily followed by many German breweries.

=== US motor vehicle headlamps ===
Rectangular headlamps were promoted in the United States where round lamps were required until 1975. By 1979, the majority of new cars had rectangular headlamps. Again, the US permitted only two standardized sizes of rectangular sealed-beam lamp: A system of two 200 mm x 142 mm high/low beam units corresponding to the existing 7" round format, or a system of four 165 mm x 100 mm units (two high/low and two high-beam) corresponding to the existing 5 3/4 inches (150 mm) round format.

In 1968, the US Department of Transportation outlawed any decorative or protective element in front of the headlamps if the headlamps are switched on. Glass-covered headlamps, like those used on the Jaguar E-Type, the pre-1968 VW Beetle, the Porsche 356, the Citroën DS and Ferrari Daytona, now had to be equipped with uncovered headlamps for the US market, further altering the look of European models sold in the United States. The change meant that vehicles designed for solid aerodynamic performance could not achieve it for the US market.

In 1984, the department changed the rule to allow replaceable-bulb headlamps of nonstandard shapes. However, some automaker could equip a vehicle with the same type of headlamps in the US as in the rest of the world. US headlamp standards are governed by Federal Motor Vehicle Safety Standard 108, which is incompatible with the UNECE standards, used in most of the rest of the world. Canada has its own headlamp standards that are similar to the US standard but allows UNECE-compliant headlamps. Headlamps were used in cars but also for traffic violation stops.
