= Anti-Revolutionary Party =

Dutch political party

Anti-Revolutionary Party Anti-Revolutionaire Partij
- Abbreviation: ARP
- Founder: Abraham Kuyper
- Founded: 3 April 1879; 147 years ago
- Dissolved: 27 September 1980; 46 years ago
- Merged into: Christian Democratic Appeal
- Headquarters: Kuyperhuis; Dr. Kuyperstraat 3 The Hague
- Think tank: Dr. A. Kuyper-stichting
- Youth wing: Anti-Revolutionary Youth Study Clubs
- Ideology: Social conservatism Christian democracy
- Political position: Centre-right
- Religion: Reformed Churches; Reformed Church; Christian Reformed Churches
- European affiliation: European Union of Christian Democrats
- European Parliament group: Christian Democratic Group
- Colours: Glossy teal (customary)

The Anti-Revolutionary Party (Dutch: Anti-Revolutionaire Partij, ARP) was a Protestant conservative and Christian democratic political party in the Netherlands between 1879 and 1980.

The ARP was founded in 1879 by Abraham Kuyper, a neo-Calvinist theologian and minister. Under his leadership, the party sought to represent the Orthodox Reformed "small folks" (kleine luyden) and obtain equal funding for religious schools. In the 1880s they achieved electoral success and became a major political force. Alongside the Catholics, they served three terms in government between 1888 and 1918. In 1898, a number of conservative members split from the party over its support for the extension of suffrage, and eventually formed the Christian Historical Union (CHU). In the interwar period the ARP was continuously in government, most prominently under the leadership of Kuyper's successor Hendrikus Colijn, who served as prime minister between 1925 and 1926, and again between 1933 and 1939.

In the postwar era the ARP was led by Jan Schouten. The party was relegated to the opposition benches by the Roman/Red coalition in 1946, but rejoined the government in 1952. In response to electoral decline in the 1960s and early 1970s, the ARP adopted a more progressive, "radical evangelical" image, while also seeking closer cooperation with the Catholic People's Party (KVP) and the CHU, with the three parties merging to form the Christian Democratic Appeal (CDA) in 1980.

== History ==
=== History before 1879 ===
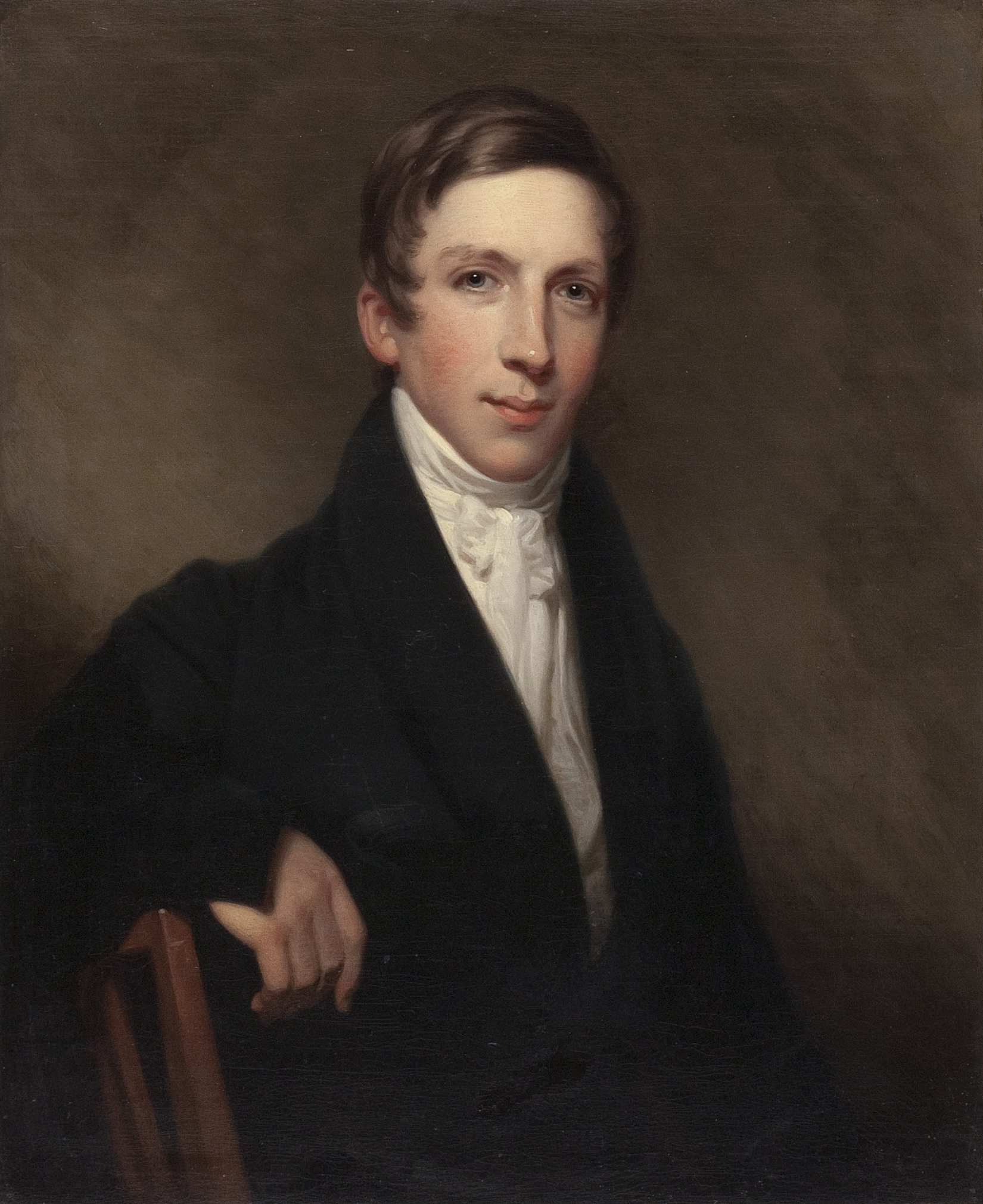
Guillaume Groen van Prinsterer in 1823, painted by Charles Howard Hodges

In the mid-19th century, the historian Guillaume Groen van Prinsterer laid the foundations of an Orthodox Reformed body of political thought. The Protestant nature of the Dutch nation occupied a central role in this body of thought, and Groen and his followers were consequently fiercely anti-Catholic; in 1853, they joined the April movement in response to the reestablishment of the episcopal hierarchy in the Netherlands. They also opposed the modern ideas of the Enlightenment and the French Revolution, including popular sovereignty, liberalism and rationalism. As such, they adopted the label antirevolutionary.

Groen had been the sole antirevolutionary in the House of Representatives since 1840, but the first direct election in 1848 saw the election of a few other antirevolutionaries. Under Groen's leadership, they formed a distinct parliamentary grouping. Despite its small size, often comprising no more than three or four members, its principled approach often made it the most important opponent of the liberals. Despite its distinct identity in parliament, however, there was much overlap between antirevolutionaries and the larger conservative movement in electoral politics. The two groups were united in their sympathy for Christian education, their concern about the direction of the Dutch Reformed Church and their love for the royal house. Many Orthodox Reformed voters voted for conservative candidates, and antirevolutionaries were generally elected only where the conservatives refrained from fielding a candidate.

This changed in the late 1860s, when the Van Zuylen van Nijevelt cabinet sought to bring about an anti-liberal coalition consisting of conservatives, antirevolutionaries and Catholics, and offered the latter two a new school act. The liberal majority in the House of Representatives formed a united front, however, and two snap elections failed to break their majority, leading the cabinet to resign in 1868. This conflict led to a polarisation between conservatives and liberals which resounded in electoral politics. Conservatives portrayed the liberals as radical republicans, while liberals decried the conservatives for their rapprochement with the Catholics. Many Catholic voters in Protestant-majority districts voted for conservative candidates, while Protestant voters shifted their support to liberal candidates.

The disappointment of the Van Zuylen van Nijevelt cabinet and the inability of the antirevolutionaries to benefit from the resulting realignment led Groen to abandon politics. This left the antirevolutionaries without a leader until the leadership was picked up by the young Dutch Reformed theologian Abraham Kuyper. Kuyper, with whom Groen van Prinsterer had begun to correspond in 1864, founded the antirevolutionary newspaper De Standaard in 1872, and was elected to the House of Representatives in 1874. He is credited with the electoral success of the antirevolutionaries in the 1870s, with their parliamentary group growing from around five members in 1868 to thirteen in 1875.

=== Founding and growth, 1879–1888 ===
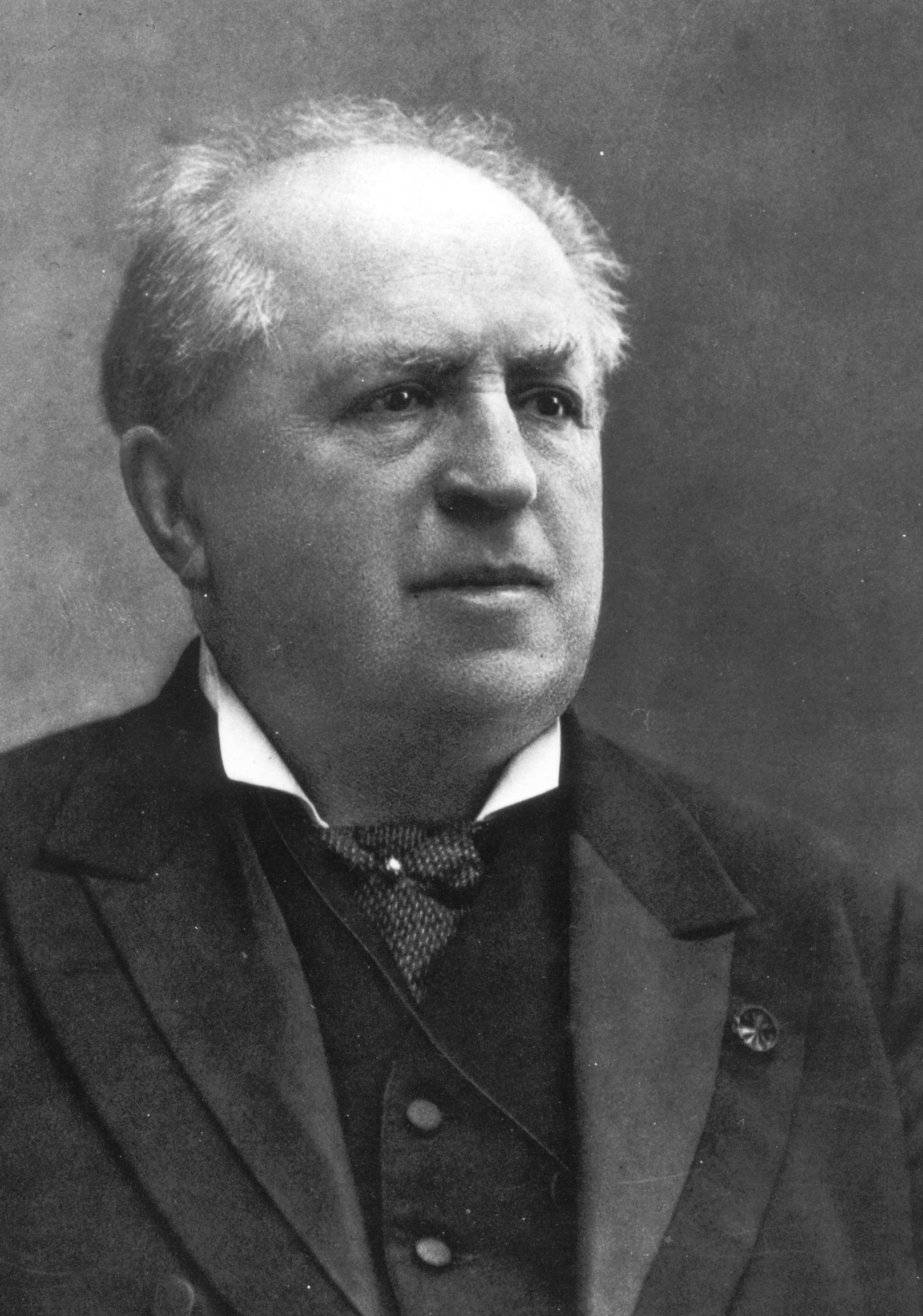
Abraham Kuyper, founder and party leader until 1920, prime minister 1901–1905

On 3 April 1879, Abraham Kuyper founded the ARP as the first nationally organised political party in the Netherlands. An 1878 petition for equal payment for religious schools became one of the catalysts for the foundation of the political movement. In 1877, Kuyper had already written "Our Programme" in which the political ideals of the ARP were written down. Around the ARP the separate Protestant society began to grow: in addition to De Standaard, many Protestant schools were founded, and the Vrije Universiteit Amsterdam was established as a Protestant university in 1880. Kuyper led the 1886 Dutch Reformed Church split, which resulted in the establishment of the Reformed Churches in the Netherlands in 1892.

While Kuyper shared Groen's anti-Catholic sentiment, the struggle for the equal funding of religious schools led him to pursue a strategic alliance with the Catholics, with whom the Anti-Revolutionaries shared this goal. This political strategy was later provided a theoretical justification in the form of Antithesis, the notion that the divide between secular and confessional parties was the primary cleavage along which political conflict revolved, superseding the rivalry between Protestants and Catholics. The approach was favourably received by Herman Schaepman, leader of the Catholics in the House of Representatives.

The strategic alliance with the Catholics, which became known as the Coalition, resulted in further electoral success in the 1880s. In 1879, thirteen antirevolutionaries were among the hundred members of the House of Representatives, although not all were members of the ARP. During the period between 1879 and 1883, their numbers grew slowly, peaking at 19. After the 1884 election they had 21 members of parliament. In 1886 they won their first seat in the Senate.

=== Antithesis, 1888–1917 ===
In the 1888 election, the ARP won 31.4% of the vote and 27 seats. A confessional cabinet was formed led by the anti-revolutionary Aeneas Mackay Jr.; it combined anti-revolutionary and Catholic ministers, joined by two conservative independents. Because the liberals still controlled the Senate, many of the cabinet's proposals met resistance there and the cabinet fell before the end of its four-year term.

In the 1891 election, the ARP lost 2% of its votes, but six of its seats. The confessional parties also lost their majority. A liberal cabinet, led by Van Tienhoven was formed. It proposed drastic changes to the census, which would result practically in universal male suffrage, proposed by minister Tak. The ARP was divided on the issue: Kuyper and a majority of the parliamentary party voted in favour of the law, while Alexander de Savornin Lohman vehemently opposed it. Kuyper had tactical reasons to support enlarged franchise – the 'kleine luyden' (middle class) who would be allowed to vote often supported the ARP. De Savorin-Lohman opposed the law because it would imply some form of popular sovereignty instead of divine sovereignty. In 1894, this resulted in a split between the ARP and the group around De Savorin-Lohman. Party discipline also played a role in the conflict between Kuyper and De Savorin-Lohman: Kuyper, the party leader, favoured strong party discipline, while De Savorin Lohman opposed strong parties. The split results in the foundation of the Free Anti Revolutionary Party in 1898, which would become the Christian Historical Union in 1904. With De Savorin-Lohman a group of prominent party politicians left the party, including many of its aristocratic members (who like De Savorin-Lohman have double names). The CHU continued its opposition against universal suffrage and was more anti-papist than the ARP.

In the 1894 election, the ARP lost almost half of its vote and six of its twenty-one seats. The Catholics broke their alliance with the ARP and supported a conservative cabinet. In the 1897 election, the ARP won back some ground: it was supported by 26% of the electorate and won seventeen seats. The group around De Savorin Lohman, won 11% of the vote and six seats. A liberal cabinet was formed and the ARP was confined to opposition.

In 1901, the ARP won a decisive victory. It won 27.4% of the vote and 23 seats. A cabinet was formed out of the ARP, the Catholics and the group around De Savorin-Lohman, now called the Christian Historical Party. The cabinet was led by Kuyper, being the first person to formally lead the cabinet for four years. It was characterised by Kuypers' authoritarian leadership. This can best be seen by the railway strike of 1903, in which Kuyper showed no mercy to the strikers and instead pushed several particularly harsh anti-strike laws through parliament. After the Senate, where there was a liberal majority, rejected Kuypers' law on higher education, which sought to bring equal titles for alumni of the Free University, which Kuyper himself founded, Kuyper called for new elections for the Senate. With a confessional majority in the Senate, the law was pushed through.

In the 1905 election, the ARP lost only 3% of the vote, but eight seats, although it was able to strengthen its position in the Senate. Kuyper, the party's leader, lost his own seat in Amsterdam to a progressive liberal. Theo Heemskerk led the anti-revolutionary parliamentary party. A minority liberal cabinet was formed. Former anti-revolutionary MP Staalman left ARP and founded the Christian Democratic Party, which later became the Christian Democratic Union, which would play a minor role in the interbellum political landscape.

In 1908, Kuyper returned to the House of Representatives. After a crisis in the liberal cabinet Theo Heemskerk was given the chance to form a new cabinet. A minority confessional cabinet was formed. In the 1909 election the ARP won 3% of vote and twenty-five seats. The Heemskerk cabinet continues.

In 1912, Kuyper left national politics because of health reasons, and in 1913, he was elected to the Senate. In the 1913 election, the ARP lost 6% of the votes. The party lost more than half of its seats, leaving them with 11 seats overall. Another minority liberal cabinet was formed. The leadership of the ARP lay in the hands of less prominent politicians. Although a relatively small opposition party, the ARP played an important role in Dutch politics. The liberal minority cabinet, led by Cort van der Linden sought to resolve two important issues in Dutch politics: the conflict over the equalisation of payment for religious schools and universal suffrage. In the constitution change of 1917 both items were resolved. The ARP was given equal payment for religious schools, but it had to accept women's suffrage and proportional representation.

=== Interwar period and World War II, 1917–1945 ===
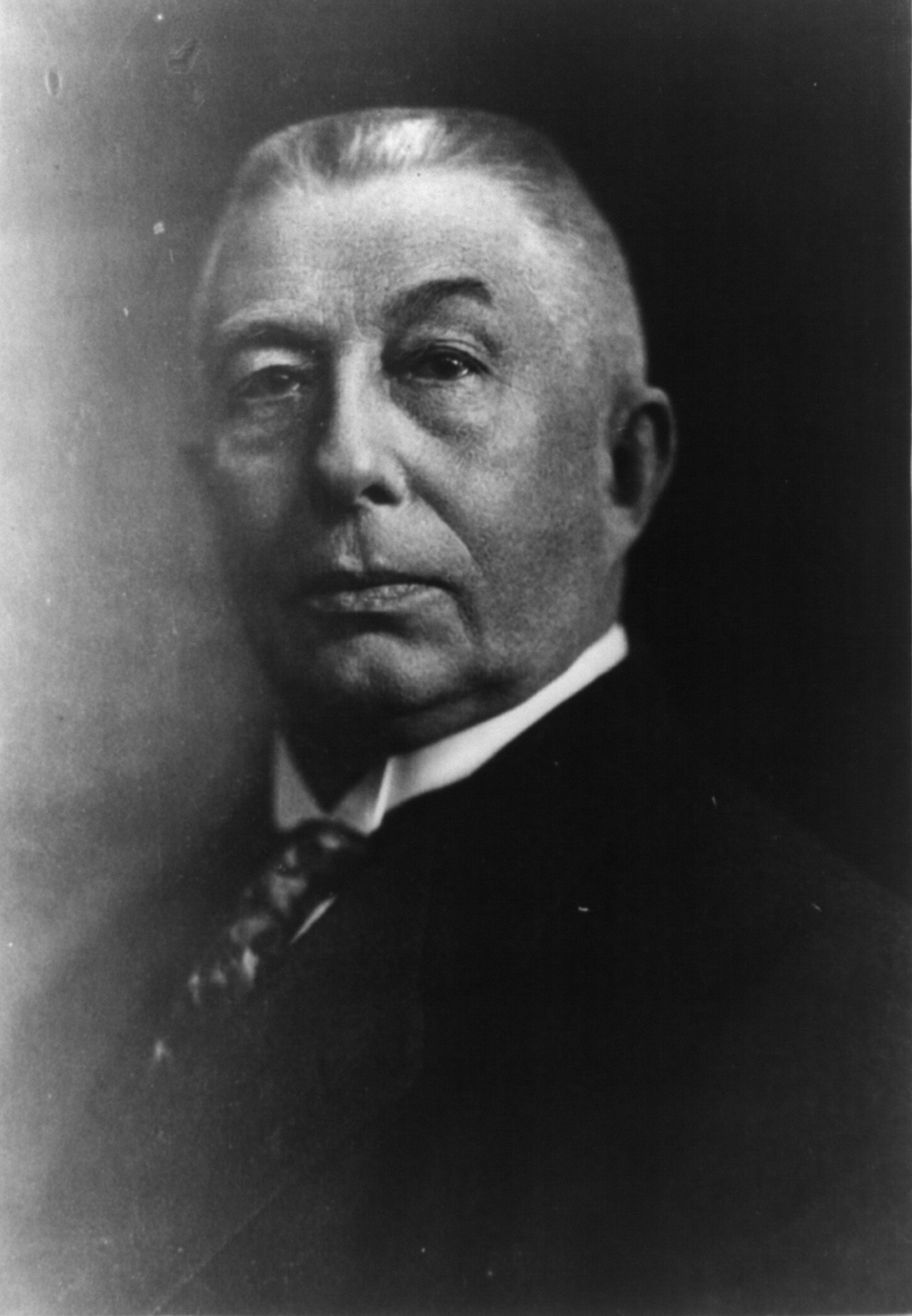
Hendrikus Colijn, party leader 1920–1940, prime minister 1925–1926 and 1933–1939

After the Pacification of 1917, marked by the introduction of universal suffrage, the party never received more than twenty percent of the vote. The 1918 election provided a decisive test for the party, where the party won two additional seats. The three confessional parties won 50 seats. The confessional parties formed a new cabinet, led by the Catholic Charles Ruijs de Beerenbrouck. The ARP supplied three ministers and former prime minister Theo Heemskerk became Minister of Justice. A group of concerned anti-revolutionaries, led by Gerrit Kersten, founded the Reformed Political Party, which opposed universal suffrage and cooperation with the Catholics. The electorate of the ARP changed in the interbellum – the difference between lower class Protestants who voted ARP and middle class Protestants who voted CHU began to disappear, with religious differences between the Dutch Reformed Church (CHU) and the Reformed Churches in the Netherlands (ARP) becoming more important.

In the 1922 election, former minister of war Hendrikus Colijn became the leader of the ARP. He emphasised defence and fiscal conservatism as core issues of the party. With him the ARP got sixteen seats in the House of Representatives and fifteen in the Senate. He became Minister of Finance in the second cabinet of Charles Ruijs de Beerenbrouck. He led the party in the 1925 election; the party lost three seats in this election. The ARP continued in government with Jan Donner as minister of Justice. In the 1929 election, the ARP lost another seat. The confessional parties continued to govern.

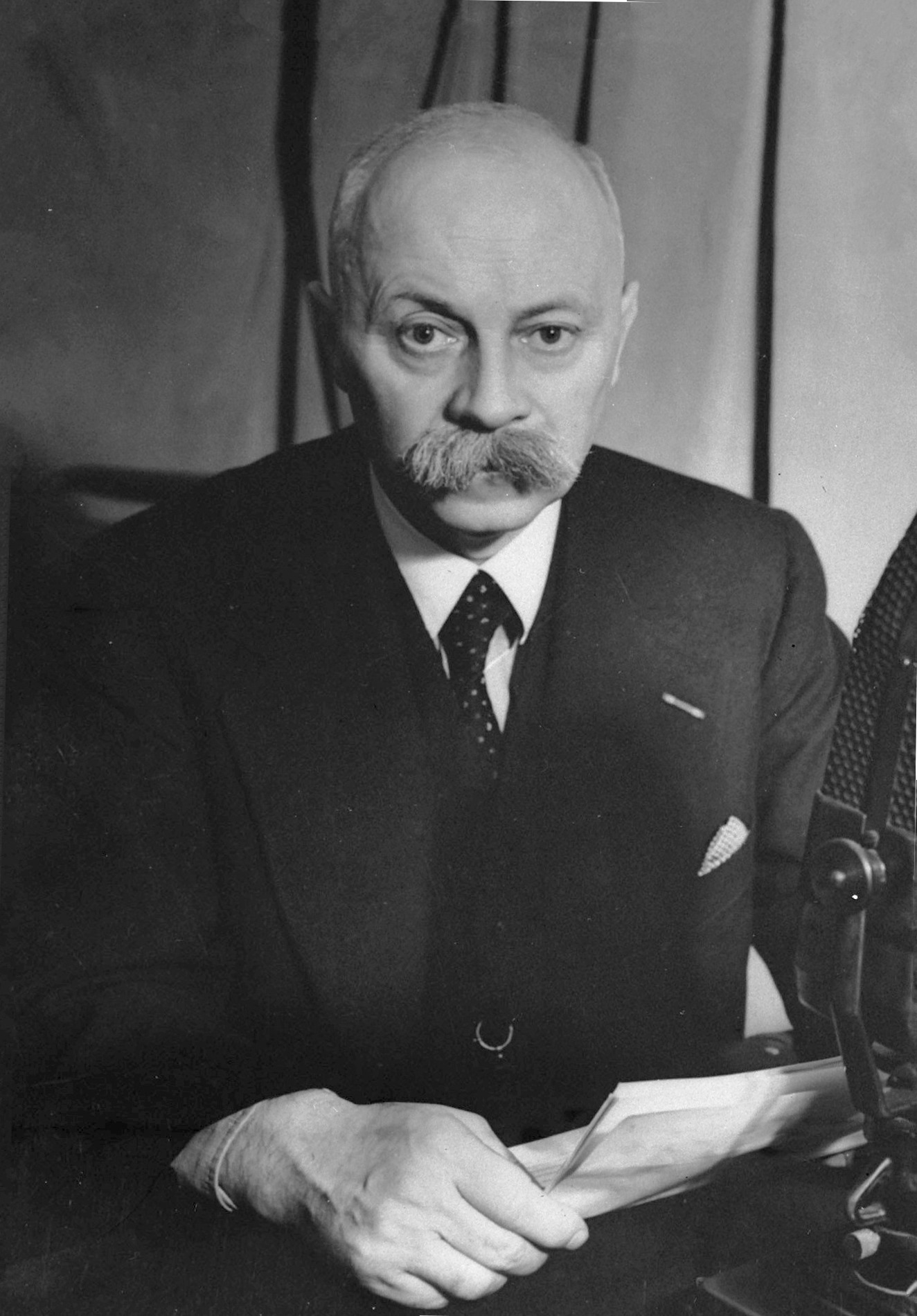
Pieter Sjoerds Gerbrandy, prime minister 1940–1945 during World War II leading the Dutch government in exile

In the 1930s, with the growing international political threats and economic crisis, the ARP began to regain its popularity, under the leadership of Colijn. In 1933, the ARP gained two seats and Colijn formed a broad cabinet comprising the Roman Catholic State Party (RKSP), CHU, ARP, Liberal State Party (LSP) and Free-thinking Democratic League (VDB). Jan Schouten led the party's parliamentary party. Between 1933 and 1939, Colijn led several parliamentary and extra-parliamentary cabinets with changing composition, although the CHU, ARP, and RKSP continued to form the core of the cabinet. Colijn refused to devalue the guilder but was unable to resolve the economic crisis. In 1937 the ARP gained three seats and reached a historic 17 seats. Colijn continued to govern. In 1939, his fifth cabinet fell and Colijn was succeeded by Dirk Jan de Geer. Pieter Gerbrandy joined the cabinet without support of his parliamentary party.

During World War II, members of the ARP played a role in both the governments-in-exile, of which many were led by Pieter Sjoerds Gerbrandy and the resistance movements. The resistance paper Trouw was founded by ARP members. Many future ARP MPs began their political career in the Dutch resistance.

=== Postwar era, 1945–1980 ===
Logo of the party from 1952 to 1968

After World War II, the ARP returned to Dutch politics. The anti-revolutionary Jo Meynen was minister of War, albeit without support of his parliamentary party.

In the 1946 election, Jan Schouten led the party. It lost four seats. During the formation, it became clear that the ARP could not govern: it strongly opposed the decolonisation of the Dutch Indies. It saw maintenance of the Dutch colonial empire as necessary for the continued wealth and power of the Netherlands. The Labour Party (PvdA) and the Catholics however favoured decolonisation, under heavy pressure from the United States. For six years the ARP was relatively isolated. In 1944, a theological conflict within the Reformed Churches in the Netherlands led to a break between the Reformed Church and the Reformed Churches (liberated). This also had political repercussions; in 1948, the Reformed Political League was set up by members of the liberated churches. They were unable to win seats until 1963. The party remained stable in the 1948 election and remained in opposition.

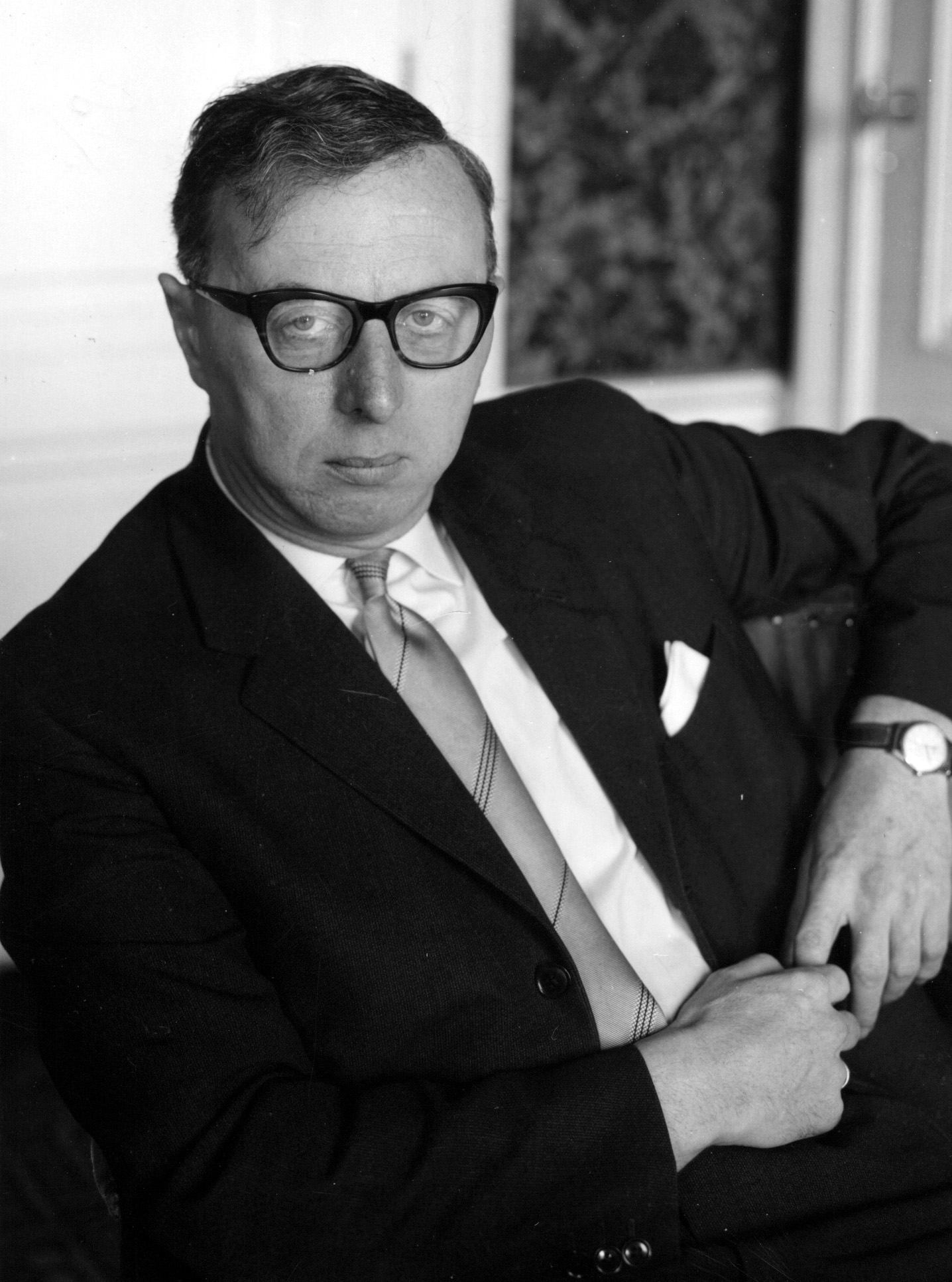
Jelle Zijlstra, party leader in 1956 and 1958–1959, prime minister 1966–1967

After the 1952 election, the ARP returned to the cabinet, which consisted of the confessional ARP, CHU, KVP and the social democratic PvdA, led by the social democrat Drees. Jelle Zijlstra became minister of economic affairs. In the 1956 election in which Jelle Zijlstra became political leader the ARP kept its 10% of the vote, but due to the enlargement of the House of Representatives it got 15 seats. A conflict between the PvdA and the KVP caused the early downfall of the cabinet. The ARP remained part of the care-taker cabinet led by Louis Beel. In the 1959 election the ARP lost another seat. It continued to be part of the cabinet, now led by Jan de Quay. The three confessional parties were joined by the conservative liberal People's Party for Freedom and Democracy.

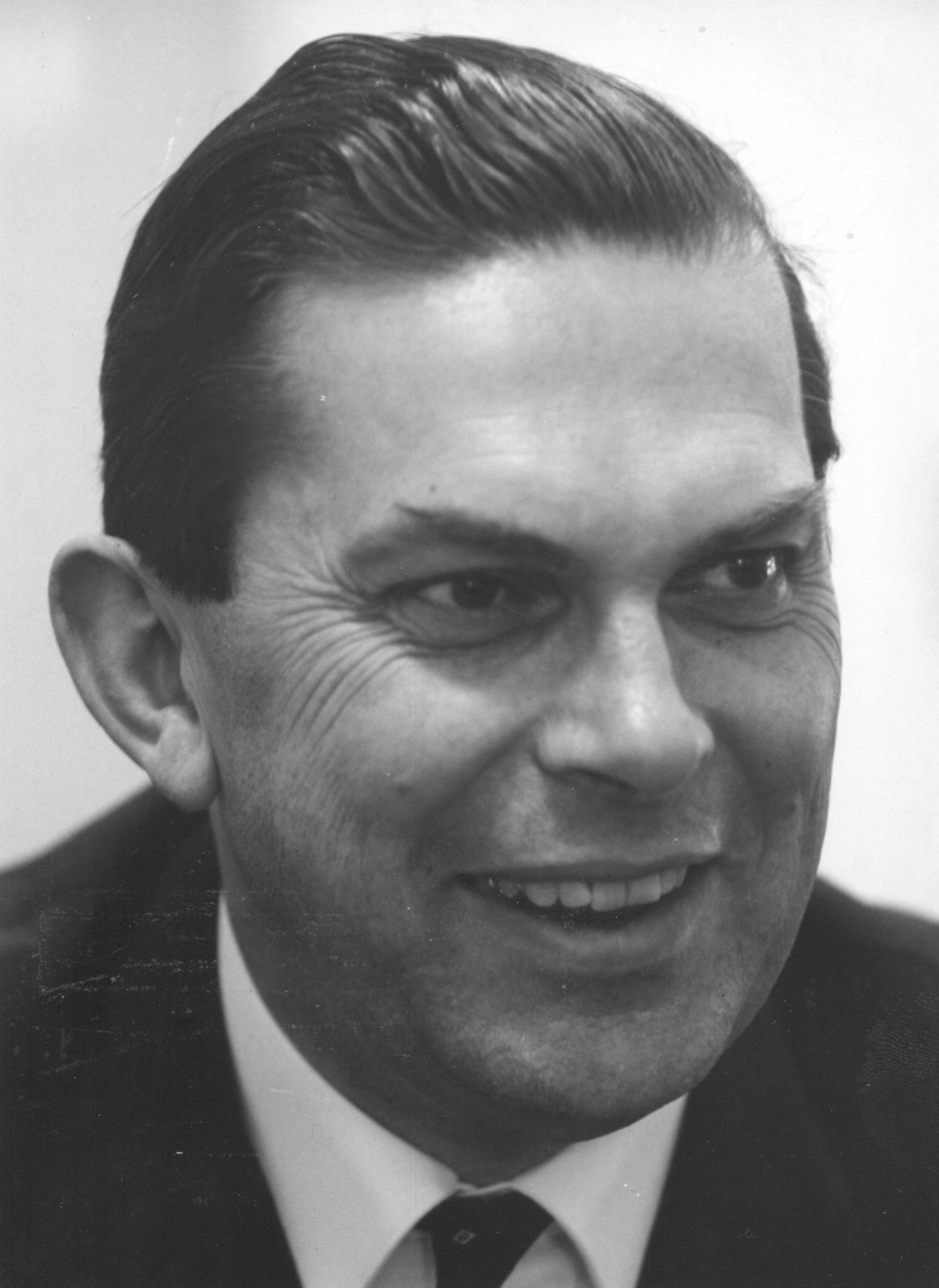
Barend Biesheuvel, party leader 1963–1973 and last Prime Minister of the ARP 1971–1973

After the 1963 election, the cabinet continued, now led by Victor Marijnen. The new anti-revolutionary leader Barend Biesheuvel became Minister of Agriculture. In 1965 this cabinet fell over a conflict between the liberals and the confessionals. The PvdA joins the ARP and the KVP in a new cabinet, led by Jo Cals. This cabinet fell after one year, over conflict between the KVP and PvdA over government spending. The ARP joins the PvdA in its plea for more government spending. A caretaker government is formed by the KVP and ARP, led by former ARP-leader Jelle Zijlstra. In the 1967 election campaign, the ARP, CHU and KVP declared that they would continue to govern together. This led to considerable conflict with the KVP, which also spilled over into the ARP, as the younger generation wanted to govern with the PvdA. The ARP gained two seats, but the KVP loses eight seats. A new liberal/confessional cabinet is formed. Biesheuvel does not enter government but instead chooses to remain in parliament.

In the 1971 election, the ARP lost two seats, and its confessional allies (KVP and CHU) lost seven and three seats respectively. They faced competition from the left-wing Christian Political Party of Radicals (PPR), which was formed by former KVP members and joined by some prominent anti-revolutionaries, including Bas de Gaay Fortman, son of Wilhelm de Gaay Fortman, one of the party's ministers. The liberal/confessional cabinet lost its majority. A new government was formed consisting of liberals and confessionals, now joined by Democratic Socialists '70, a group of moderate social democrats who left the "radicalising" PvdA. This cabinet was led by Barend Biesheuvel. Willem Aantjes became the chair of the party's parliamentary party. Under his leadership the ARP fashioned itself a new left-wing "radical evangelical" image, while the CHU retained its conservative image. The cabinet did not hold together for long: DS '70 were unable to agree with proposed budget cuts, and the cabinet fell. In the subsequent election the ARP gained one seat. After long coalition talks several prominent anti-revolutionaries, including Wilhelm de Gaay Fortman, joined the progressive cabinet led by Joop den Uyl. The cabinet was riddled with conflicts between confessional and progressive politicians.

=== Dissolution ===
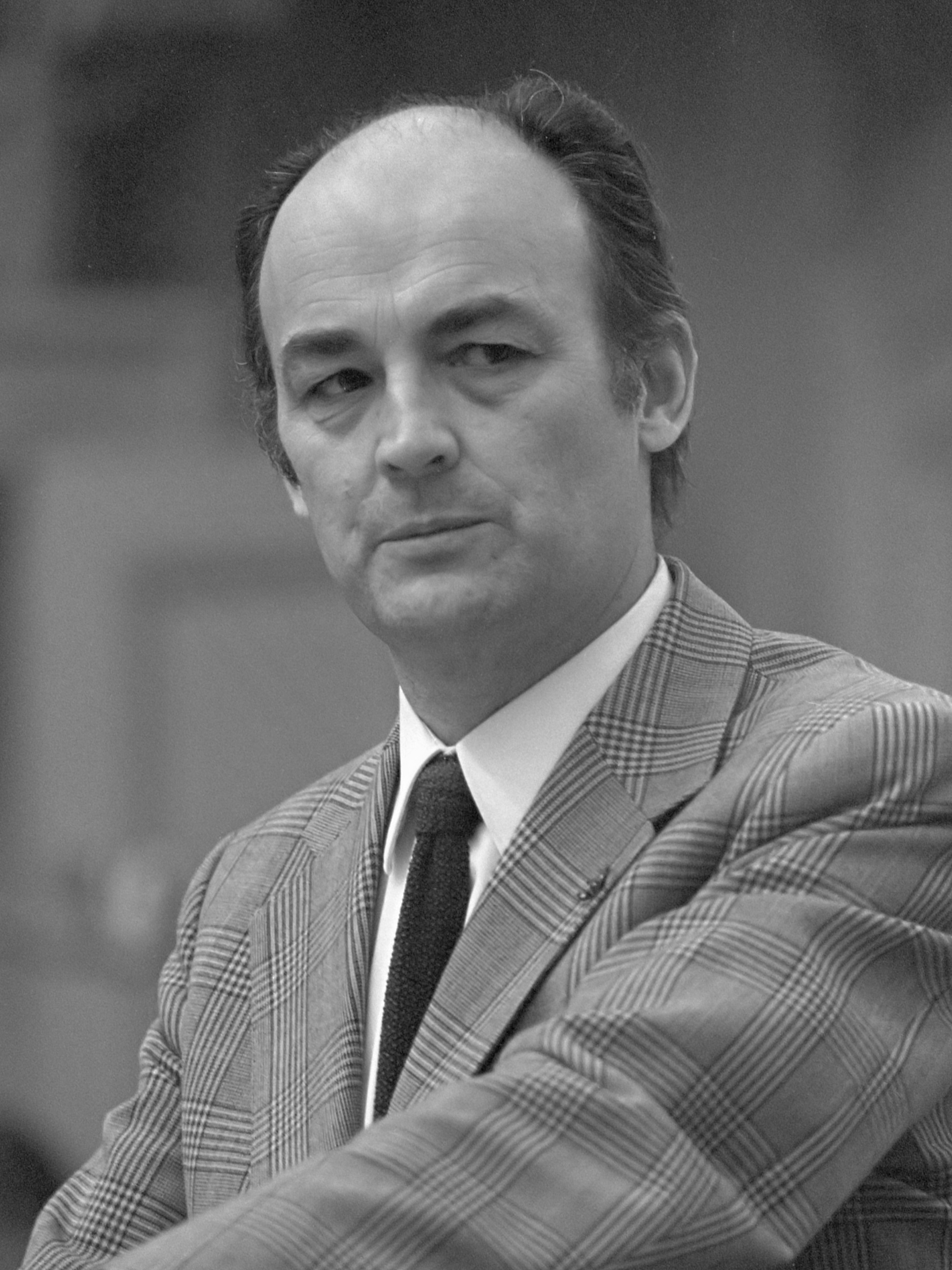
Willem Aantjes, the last party leader from 1973 until 1977

Meanwhile, a process of merger had started between the KVP, ARP and CHU. In 1974 they founded a federation called the Christian Democratic Appeal (CDA). In the formation of a common Christian democratic identity anti-revolutionary Aantjes played a decisive role: he orients the party towards the sermon on the Mount where Christ says that Christians should clothe the naked and feed the hungry. In the 1977 election, they campaigned together under as the CDA. Some prominent anti-revolutionaries, like Aantjes did not agree the CDA/VVD cabinet that was formed after the election and wanted to continue with the PvdA. However, they supported the cabinet politically. A group of these anti-revolutionaries left the CDA in 1981 to found the left-wing Christian Evangelical People's Party.

While the ARP was one of the dominant forces in the merged party, it was not until 2002 that a CDA member with anti-revolutionary roots became Prime Minister, Jan Peter Balkenende.

== Ideology ==
The ARP started out as an Orthodox Protestant party, heavily opposed to the ideals of the French Revolution. Against the revolution, they put the Bible: instead of liberty, it favoured divine providence, instead of equality it favoured hierarchy and instead of brotherhood it favoured sovereignty in its own circle. Its ideals could be summed up in the tripartite motto "God, the Netherlands and the House of Orange". For most of its history it maintained this conservative Protestant image. In the 1960s and 1970s the party began to adopt a more left-wing "radical evangelical" image.

=== God ===
The ARP was a confessional Protestant party which based its politics on the Bible and opposed the concept of popular sovereignty.

The concept of sphere sovereignty was very important for the party. It wanted to create an independent Protestant society within the Dutch society, with its own schools, papers, hospitals etc. It sought equal government finances for its own institutions. Societies should care for their own, therefore they opposed a large role for the state in social-economic policy.

The ARP saw an important role for the state in upholding the values of the Dutch people. It was socially conservative: it opposed mixed-sex education, mandatory vaccination, divorce, pornography, euthanasia, abortion etc. It also favoured capital punishment.

=== Netherlands ===
The party can be seen as rather nationalist. It favoured a strong defence to retain Dutch neutrality. It opposed decolonisation. It saw the colonies in Indonesia as vital for the continued wealth and influence of the Dutch people. It also wanted to enlighten the native population with Christian values.

=== Monarchy ===
The ARP favoured monarchy, and saw the House of Orange as historically and religiously linked to the Dutch people. It opposed changes to Dutch political system, it wanted to retain bicameralism, opposed popular referendums etc. Its commitment to universal suffrage was only tactical as the ARP expected that it would be able to gain more seats this way. Principally it wanted Householder Franchise where the head of the household would vote for his family.

The party was fiscally conservative: the Dutch government should be like a good father; it should not spend more than it got through taxes.

=== Christian radicalism ===
In the 1960s and 1970s, the party became more left-wing on many issues. Social justice became an important ideal of the party, both nationally, where it began to favour a stronger welfare state, and internationally, where development aid became an important issue.

== Organisation ==
=== Leaders ===
Leader		Term of office	Age as leader	Lead candidate
Abraham Kuyper	Abraham Kuyper (1837–1920)	3 April 1879 – 31 March 1920	41–82	1918
Hendrikus Colijn	Hendrikus Colijn (1869–1944)	31 March 1920 – 18 September 1944; Died in office	50–75	1922; 1925; 1929; 1933; 1937
J. (Jan) Schouten	Jan Schouten (1883–1963)	5 May 1945 – 23 April 1956	61–72	1946; 1948; 1952
Jelle Zijlstra	Jelle Zijlstra (1918–2001)	23 April 1956 – 3 October 1956	37–38	1956
Sieuwert Bruins Slot	Sieuwert Bruins Slot (1906–1972)	3 October 1956 – 29 December 1958	50–52	None
Jelle Zijlstra	Jelle Zijlstra (1918–2001)	29 December 1958 – 26 May 1959	40	1959
Sieuwert Bruins Slot	Sieuwert Bruins Slot (1906–1972)	26 May 1959 – 1 July 1963	53–57	None
Barend Biesheuvel	Barend Biesheuvel (1920–2001)	1 July 1963 – 7 March 1973	43–52	1963; 1967; 1971; 1972
Willem Aantjes	Willem Aantjes (1923–2015)	7 March 1973 – 25 May 1977	50–54	None

=== Prime Ministers ===
- Barend Biesheuvel (1971–1973)
- Jelle Zijlstra (1966–1967)
- Pieter Sjoerds Gerbrandy (1940–1945)
- Hendrikus Colijn (1925–1926, 1933–1939)
- Theo Heemskerk (1908–1913)
- Abraham Kuyper (1901–1905)
- Aeneas Mackay Jr. (1888–1891)

=== Leadership ===
- Party chair
  - 1975–1980 Hans de Boer
  - 1973–1975 Jan de Koning
  - 1968–1973 Antoon Veerman
  - 1968 Anton Roosjen
  - 1956–1968 Wiert Berghuis
  - 1955–1956 Anton Roosjen
  - 1941–1955 Jan Schouten
  - 1939–1941 Hendrikus Colijn
  - 1933–1939 Jan Schouten
  - 1920–1933 Hendrikus Colijn
  - 1907–1920 Abraham Kuyper
  - 1905–1907 Herman Bavinck
  - 1879–1905 Abraham Kuyper
- Parliamentary leaders in the Senate
  - Alexander Idenburg (1922–1924)
  - Anne Anema (1925–1926)
  - Hendrikus Colijn (1926–1929)
  - Anne Anema (1929–1960)
  - Wiert Berghuis (1960–1971)
  - Gaius de Gaay Fortman (1971–1973)
  - Wil Albeda (1973–1977)
- Parliamentary leaders in the House of Representatives
  - Abraham Kuyper (1894)
  - Jan van Alphen (1894–1896)
  - Abraham Kuyper (1896–1901)
  - Jan van Alphen (1901–1903)
  - Theo Heemskerk (1903–1908)
  - Jan Hendrik de Waal Malefijt (1908)
  - Abraham Kuyper (1908–1912)
  - Gerrit Middelberg (1912–1913)
  - Coenraad van der Voort van Zijp (1913–1919)
  - Victor Rutgers (1919–1922)
  - Hendrikus Colijn (1922–1923)
  - Victor Rutgers (1923–1925)
  - Theo Heemskerk (1925–1929)
  - Hendrikus Colijn (1929–1933)
  - Jan Schouten (1933–1956)
  - Jelle Zijlstra (1956)
  - Sieuwert Bruins Slot (1956–1963)
  - Henk van Eijsden (1963)
  - Barend Biesheuvel (1963)
  - Jan Smallenbroek (1963–1965)
  - Bauke Roolvink (1965–1967)
  - Barend Biesheuvel (1967–1971)
  - Willem Aantjes (1971–1972)
  - Barend Biesheuvel (1972–1973)
  - Willem Aantjes (1973–1977)

=== Municipal and provincial government ===
The party was particularly strong in rural municipal and provincial governments. Especially in Friesland, Overijssel, Zeeland and the Veluwe the party was particularly strong.

== Electorate ==
The electorate of the ARP has seen three decisive shifts, especially in its relation with the CHU, the other Protestant party. Although dates are given here, the changes were gradual.

- Between 1879 and 1917 the ARP appealed to "kleine luyden" (Dutch for the little people), the middle class, farmers, and workers, as a confessional party that favoured universal suffrage.
- Between 1917 and 1967 the ARP appealed to members of the Reformed Churches in the Netherlands.
- Between 1967 and 1977, in the time of secularisation and depillarisation the party was able to appeal to younger generations, as the more left-wing confessional party.

== Organisation ==
=== National organisation ===
The party's national secretariat was long housed in the Kuyper House in The Hague. It now houses the national secretariat of the Christian Democratic Appeal.

=== Linked organisations ===
The party published the magazine Nederlandse Gedachten ("Dutch Thoughts"). Its youth organisation was the Anti-Revolutionaire Jongeren Studieclubs ("Anti-Revolutionary Youth Study Clubs"). Its scientific institute was the Dr. A. Kuyper Foundation.

=== International organisations ===
Internationally the ARP was a relatively isolated party. In the European Parliament its members sat in the Christian Democratic group.

=== Pillarised organisations ===
The party had close ties to many Protestant organisations, such as the Reformed Churches in the Netherlands, the Protestant broadcaster NCRV, the employers' organisation NCW, the Christian National Trade Union Federation, and the paper De Standaard and after World War II, the Trouw. Together these organisations formed the Protestant pillar.

=== Relationships to other parties ===
Because of the philosophy of Antithesis, the ARP had strong links with the Catholic parties, the General League/Roman Catholic State Party/Catholic People's Party (KVP), and the Christian Historical Union (CHU). In the period 1879 to 1917 it saw the Liberal Union as its main opponent. After 1917 it saw the social democratic Social Democratic Workers' Party as its main opponent, and it formed several governments with liberals.

After World War II, the ARP became more isolated because of its position on the decolonisation of the Dutch East Indies. After Indonesia became independent, it joined the Labour Party (PvdA), KVP and the CHU in the cabinet. Links with the KVP were exceptionally good and it governed with the KVP and either the CHU and the PvdA. After the 1960s, calls to govern with the PvdA became stronger.

== International comparison ==
Internationally, the ARP was very similar to the Scandinavian Christian Democratic parties (such as the Swedish, Norwegian, Danish and the Finnish Christian Democrats), that are all socially and fiscally conservative, with a social heart. All have their roots in orthodox tendencies within the national church. In its conservative policies the ARP also shared similarities with the UK Conservatives (the paternalistic or moderate conservative wing of that party). Comparing the ARP to an American party is more difficult, but is seemed somewhat close to the moderate wing of the US Republicans (although the ARP was more socially inclined) or the conservative wing of the US Democratic Party.
