= Sint-Michielsgestel (municipality) =

- Municipality
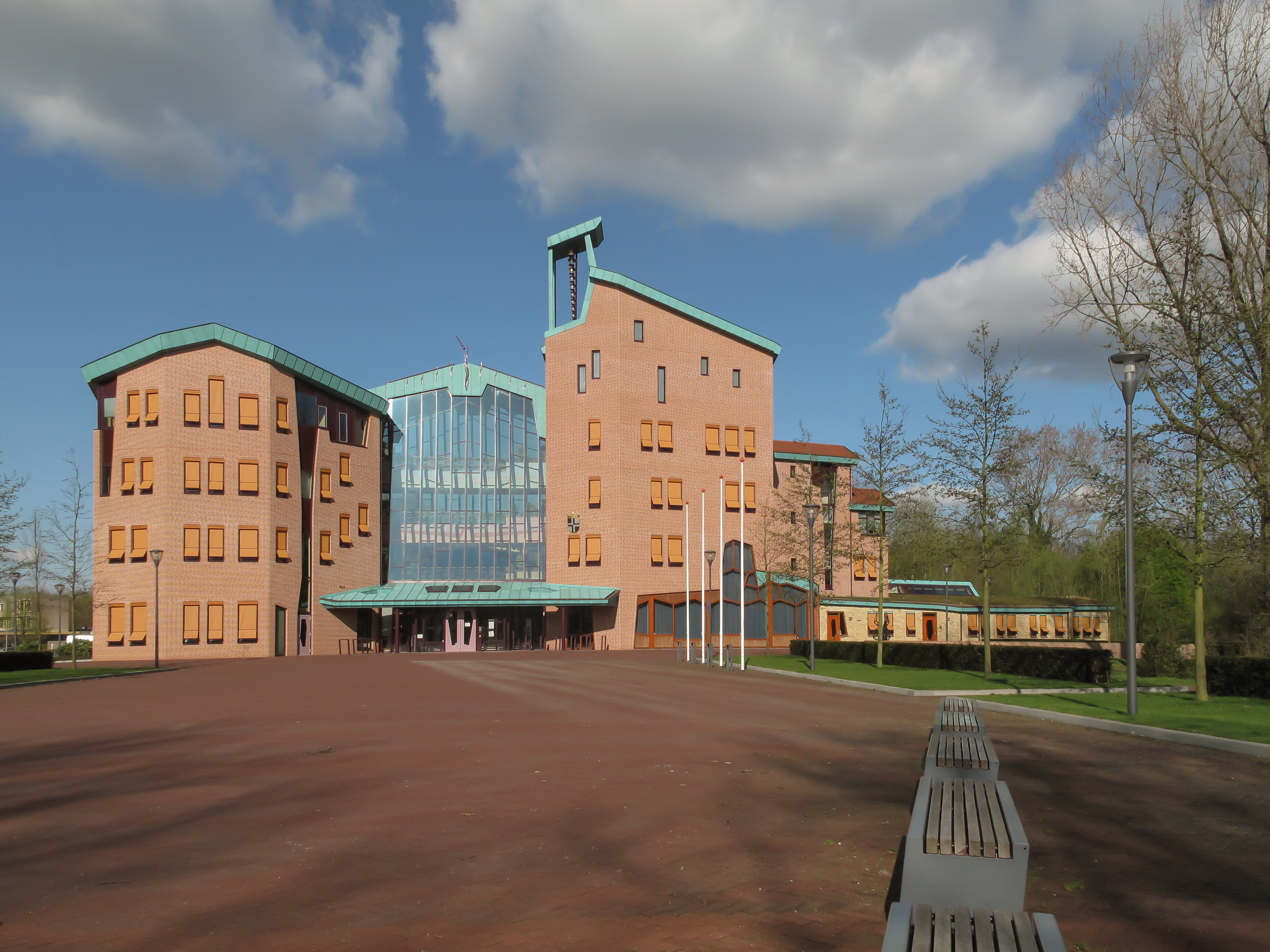
- Town hall of Sint-Michielsgestel

- Flag Coat of arms

- Location in North Brabant
- Coordinates: 51°38′N 5°21′E
- Country: Netherlands
- Province: North Brabant

Government
  - Body: Municipal council
  - Mayor: Eiko Smid (CDA)

Area
  - Total: 59.34 km^{2} (22.91 sq mi)
  - Land: 58.38 km^{2} (22.54 sq mi)
  - Water: 0.96 km^{2} (0.37 sq mi)
- Elevation: 6 m (20 ft)

Population (January 2021)
  - Total: 29,498
  - Density: 505/km^{2} (1,310/sq mi)
- Time zone: UTC+1 (CET)
  - Summer (DST): UTC+2 (CEST)
- Postcode: 5258, 5270–5275, 5290–5294
- Area code: 073
- Website: sint-michielsgestel.nl

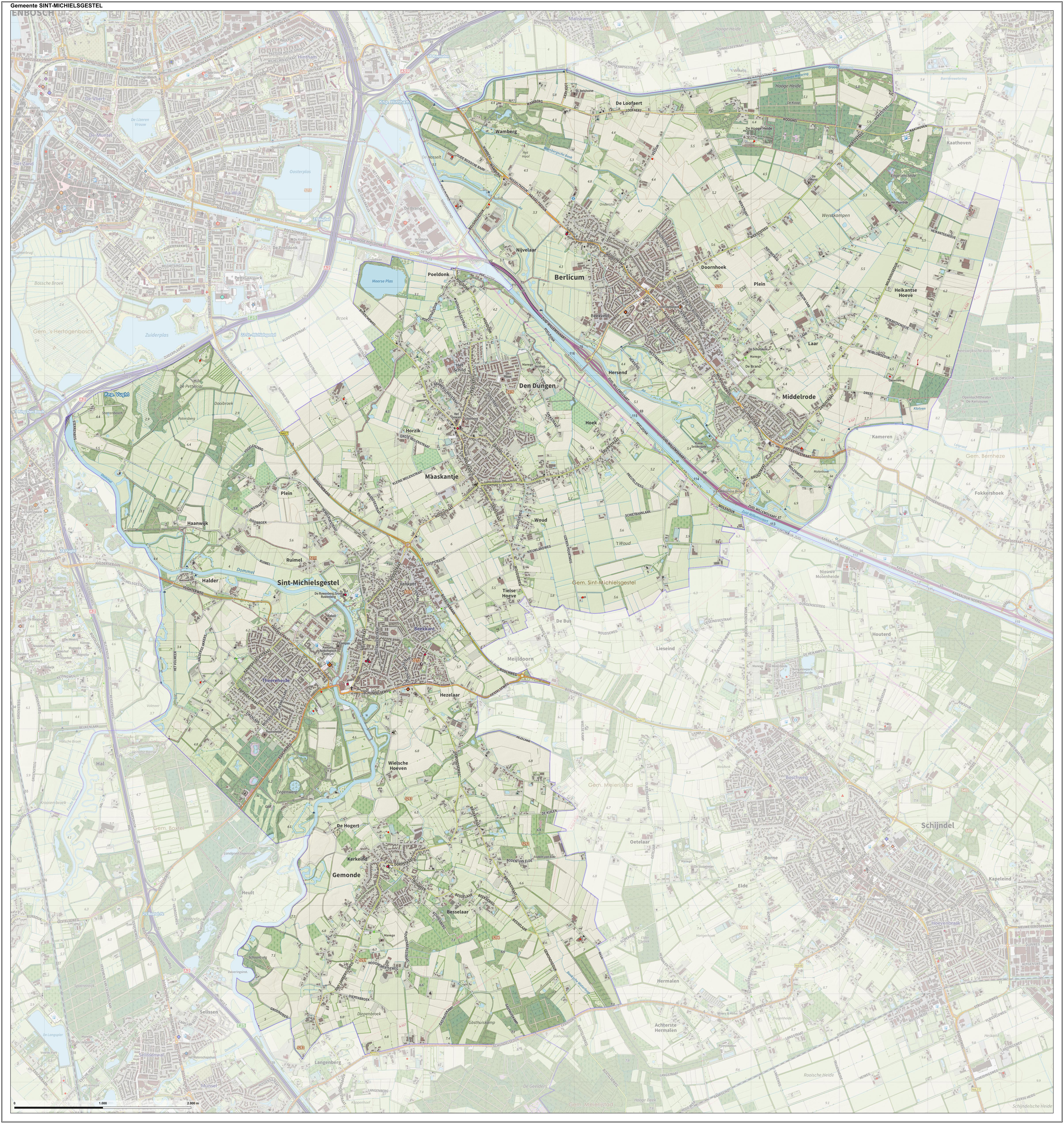
Map of Sint-Michielsgestel, June 2015

Sint-Michielsgestel (Dutch pronunciation: [ˈsɪnt miˌxilsˈxɛstəl]) is a municipality in the southern part of the Netherlands. It is named for the village of Sint-Michielsgestel located within its boundaries.

== Population centres ==
- Berlicum
- Den Dungen
- Gemonde
- Sint-Michielsgestel

Smaller townships, also part of Sint-Michielsgestel, are: Besselaar, Doornhoek, Haanwijk, Hal, Halder, De Bus, De Hogert, De Loofaart, Heikantse Hoeve, Hersend, Hezelaar, Hoek, Kerkeind, Laar, Maaskantje, Middelrode, Nijvelaar, Plein, Poeldonk, Ruimel, Tielse Hoeve, Wielsche Hoeven, Wamberg and Woud.

== Contemporary Sint-Michielsgestel ==
The municipality consists of a number of villages and rural areas just south and south east of 's-Hertogenbosch. Most inhabitants are commuters preferring to live in these quite villages, while working elsewhere. There is little industrial activity in the villages, but the agricultural sector is important.

Sint-Michielsgestel and Gemonde are in the drainage basin of the river Dommel. Den Dungen, Berlicum and Middelrode are in that of the Aa (Meuse) and the Zuid-Willemsvaart. As a result, there are very few roads connecting these two groups of settlements.

== History ==
The current municipality Sint-Michielsgestel was created in 1996. That year the municipalities of Sint-Michielsgestel, Den Dungen (est. 1810) and Berlicum (est. 1238) were merged. The entire village of Gemonde, which had previously been part of Boxtel, Sint-Michielsgestel, Sint-Oedenrode and Schijndel, was added to the new municipality.

== Local government ==
The municipal council of Sint-Michielsgestel consists of 23 seats, which divided as follows after the March 2026 municipal elections:

- De Gestelse Coalitie (SMG) - 7 seats
- Local Political Alliance (PPA) - 6 seats
- D66 - 3 seats
- GroenLinks/PvdA - 2 seats
- CDA - 2 seats
- VVD - 2 seats
- DorpsGoed - 1 seat

Since the March 2026 elections, the municipal board (college van burgemeester en wethouders) is formed by the SMG and the PPA.

== Notable people ==
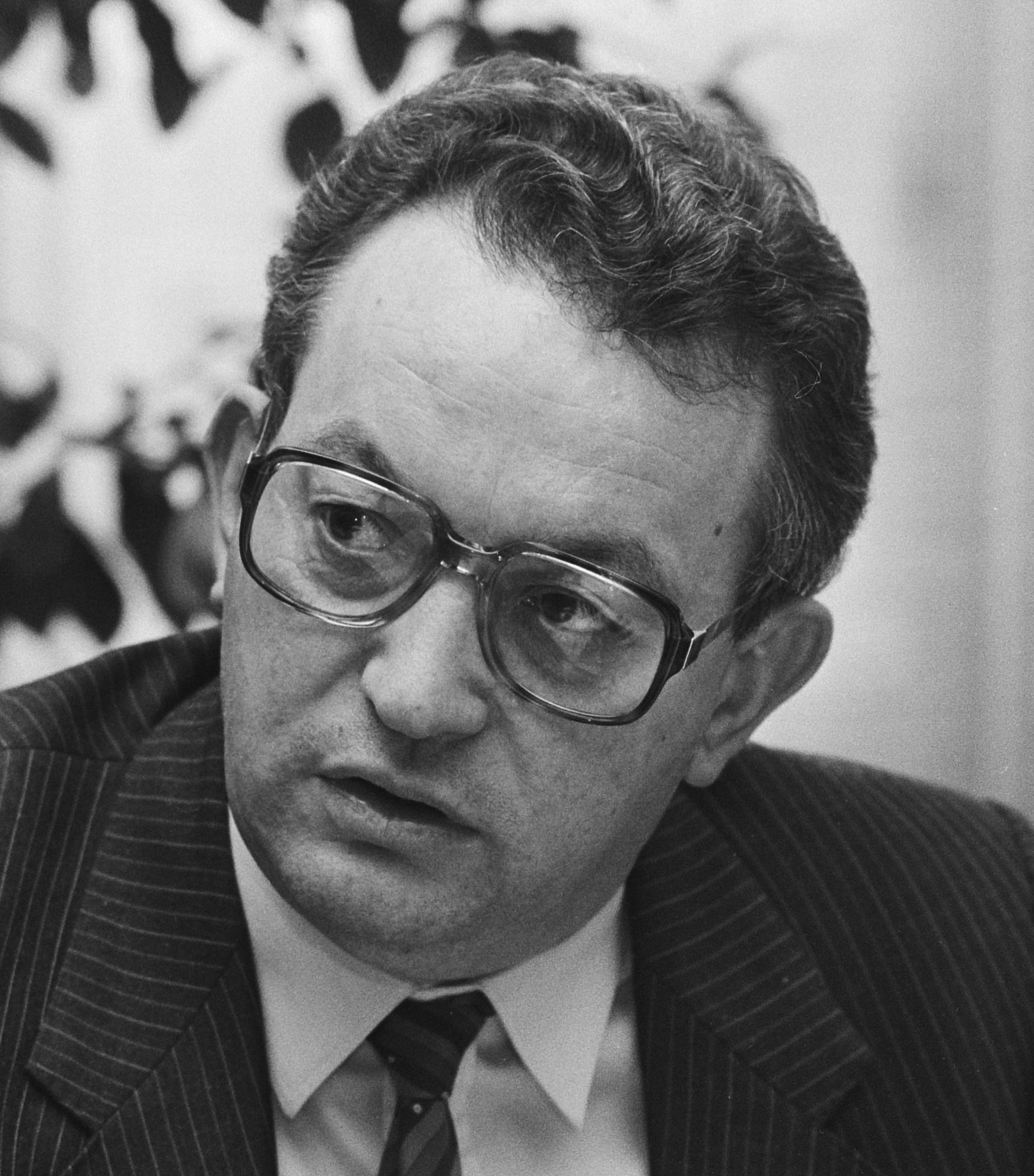
Gerrit Braks, 1984

- Gerrit Braks (1933–2017) a politician and agronomist
- Cas Wouters (born 1943–2025) a sociologist who embraced figurational sociology
- Anneke van Giersbergen (born 1973) a singer, songwriter, guitarist and pianist; formerly of The Gathering

=== Sport ===
- Jan van Grinsven (born 1960 in Den Dungen) a former football goalkeeper with 484 club caps
- Ronald Jansen (born 1963) a former field hockey goalkeeper, gold medallist in the 1996 and 2000 Summer Olympics
- Kees Akerboom Jr. (born 1983) a retired basketball player
- Tom van Weert (born 1990) a retired footballer who played for clubs in the Netherlands, Denmark and Greece

== Gallery ==
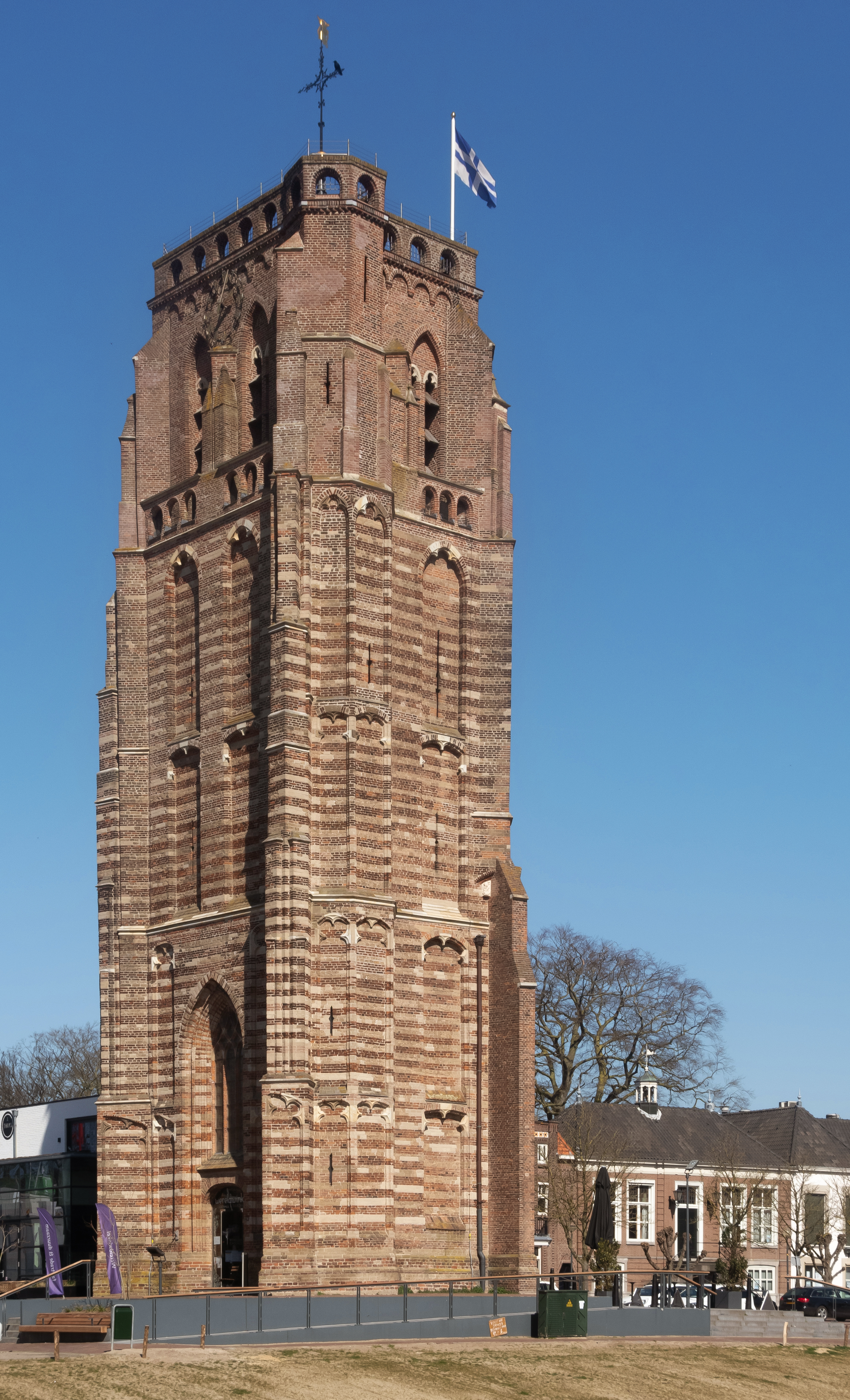
Sint-Michielsgestel, the Tower

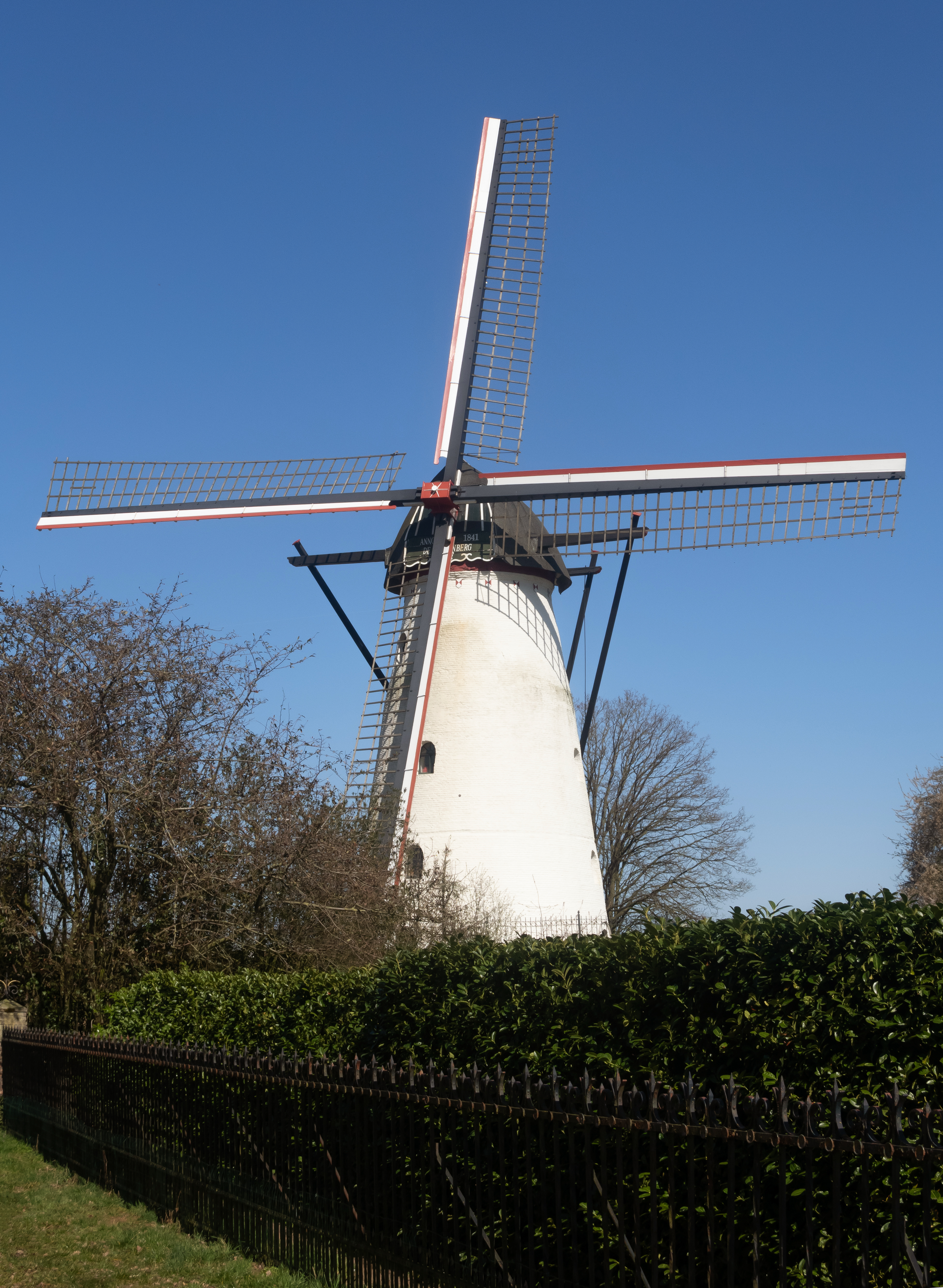
Sint-Michielsgestel, windmill: the Genenberg

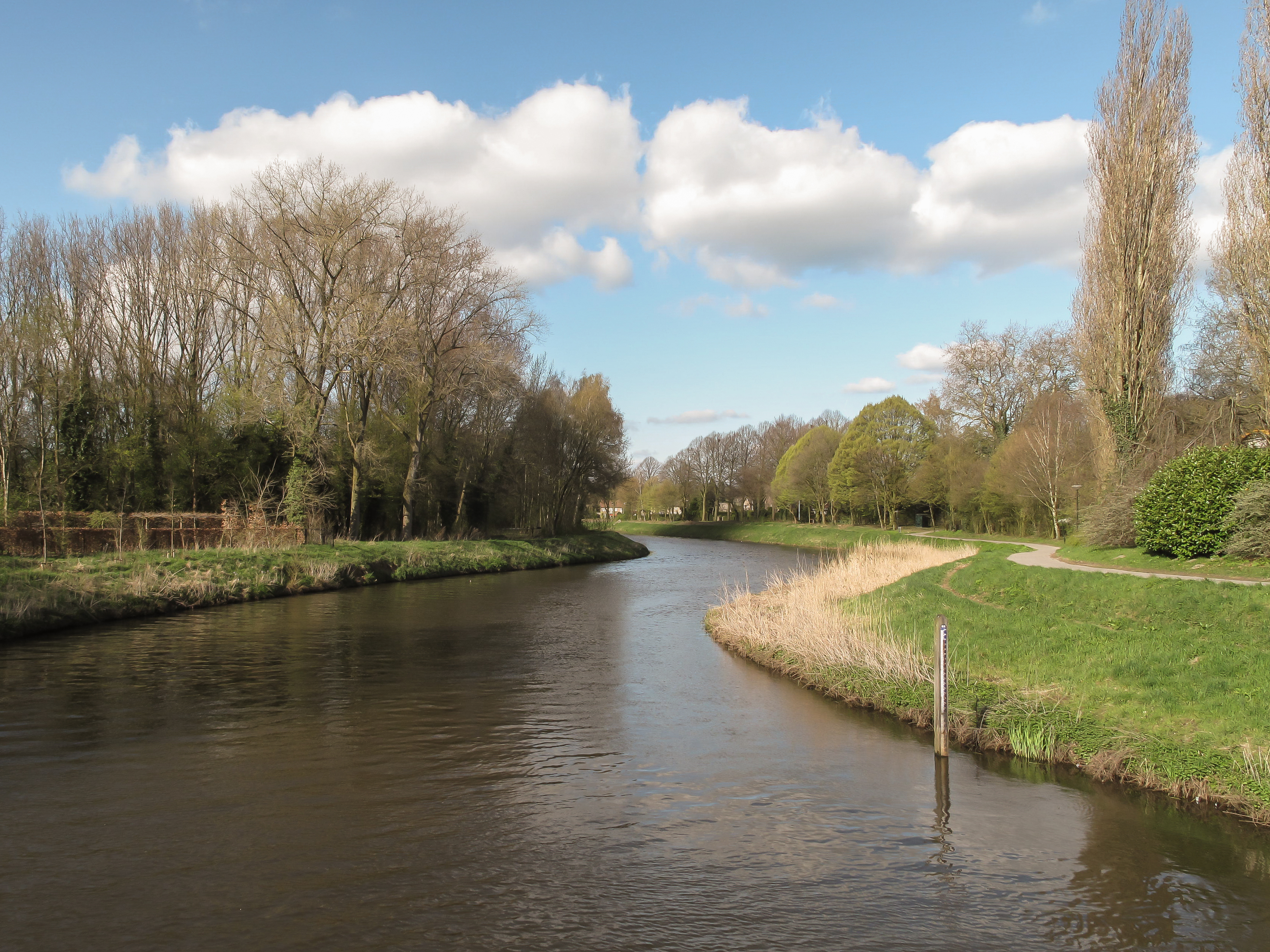
The Dommel near Sint Michielsgestel

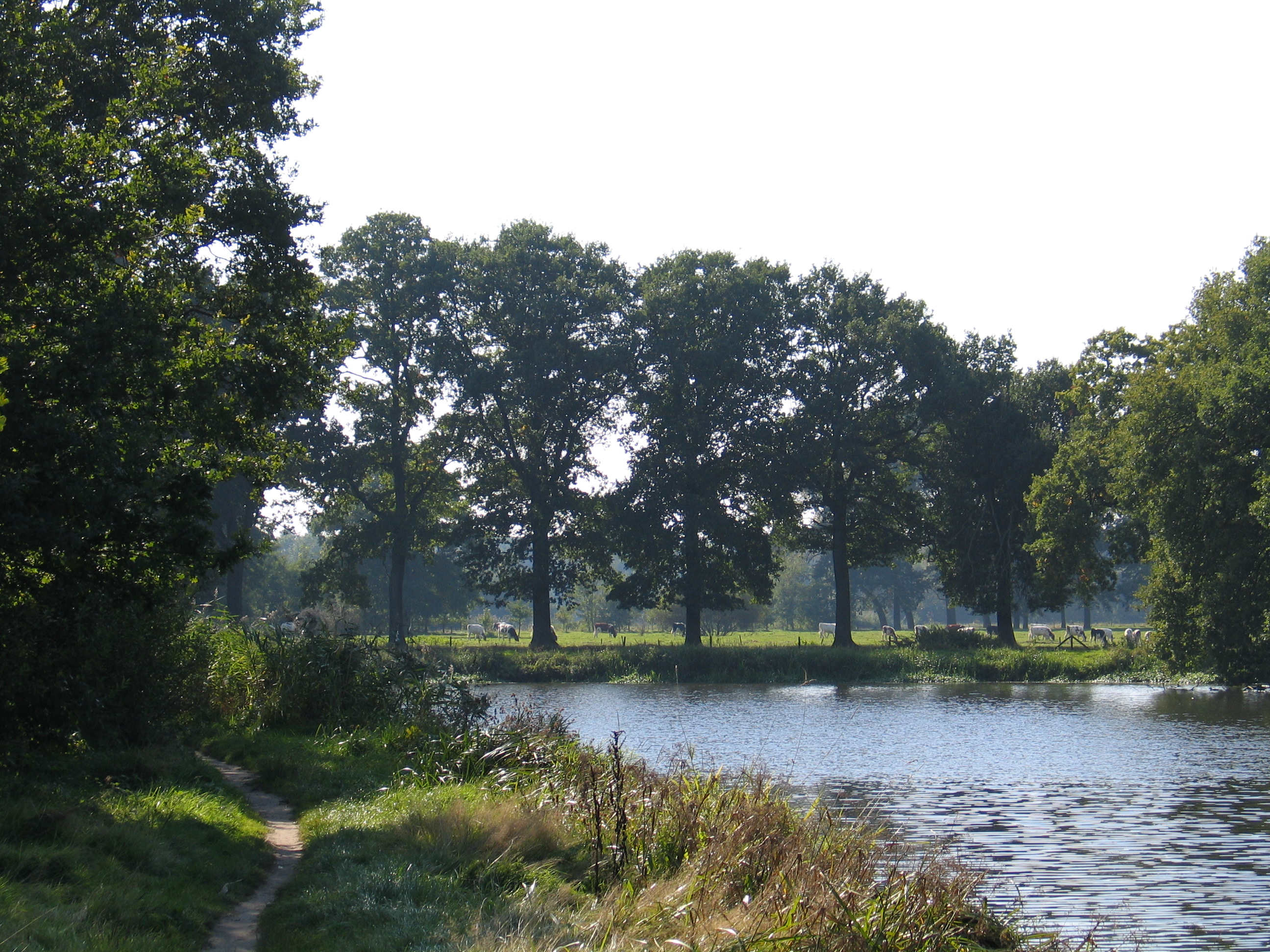
Dommel near Gemonde

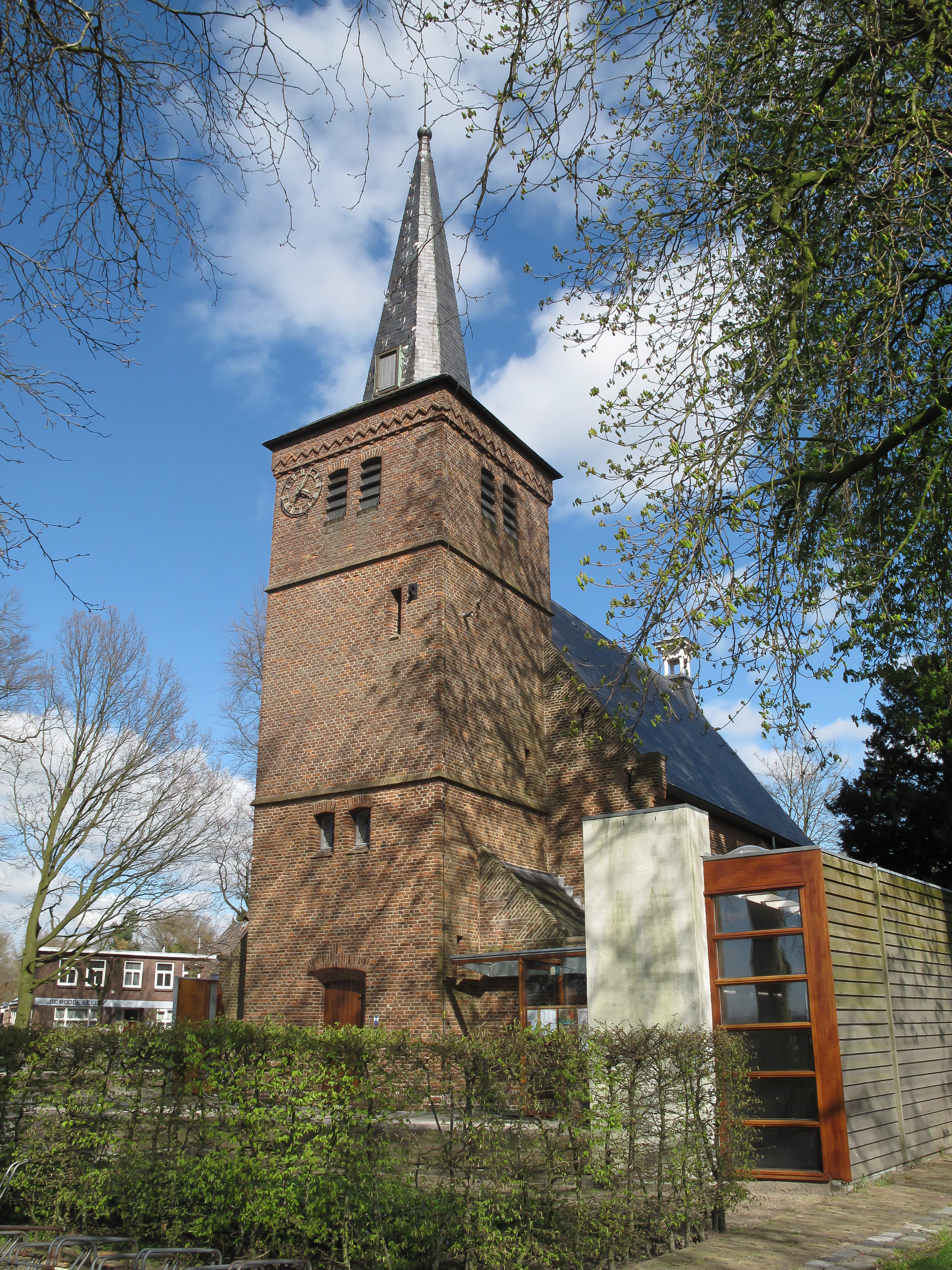
Berlicum, church

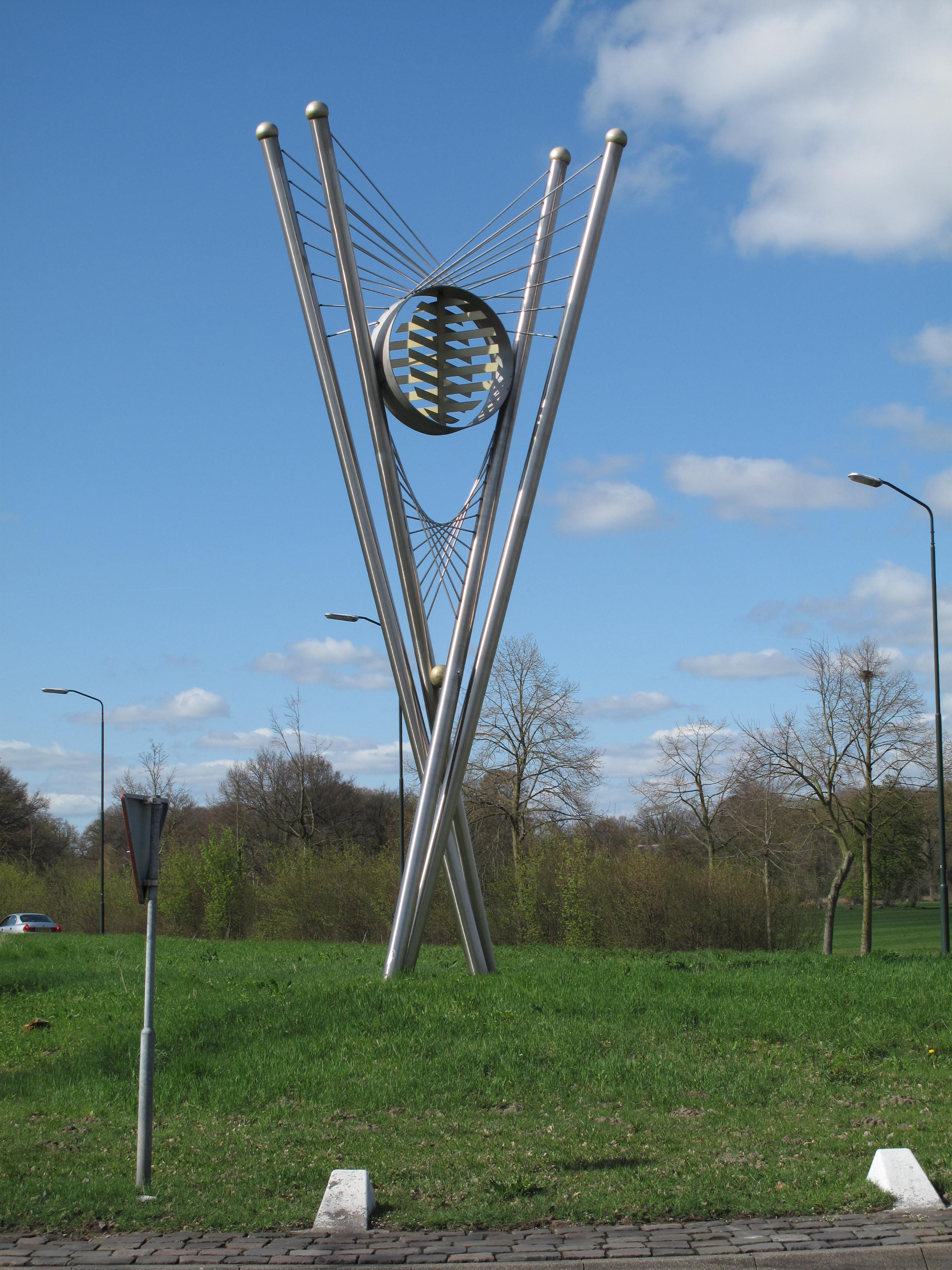
Berlicum, modern art on the street

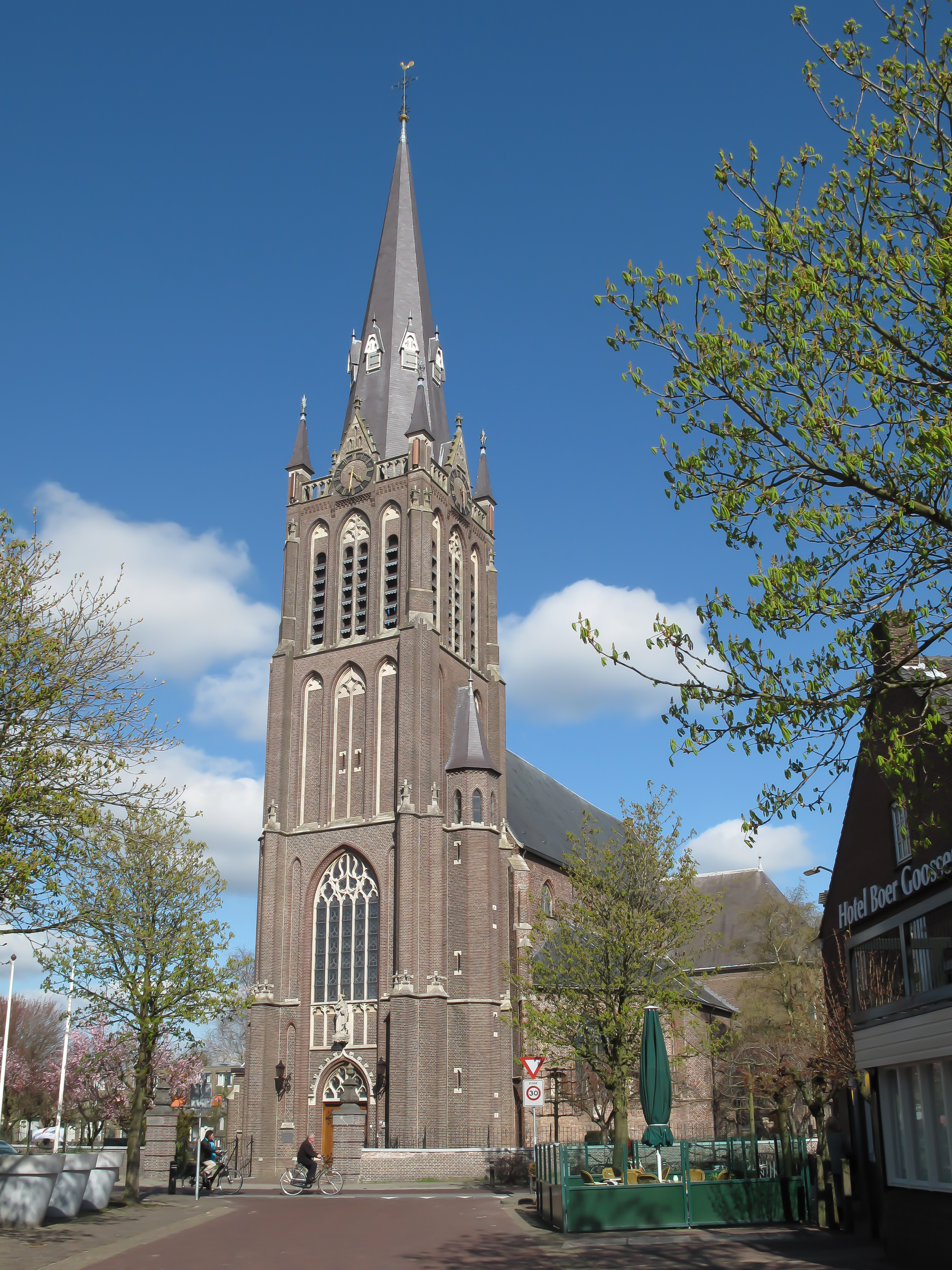
Den Dungen, church
