= Haanwijk =

Estate and nature reserve in the Netherlands

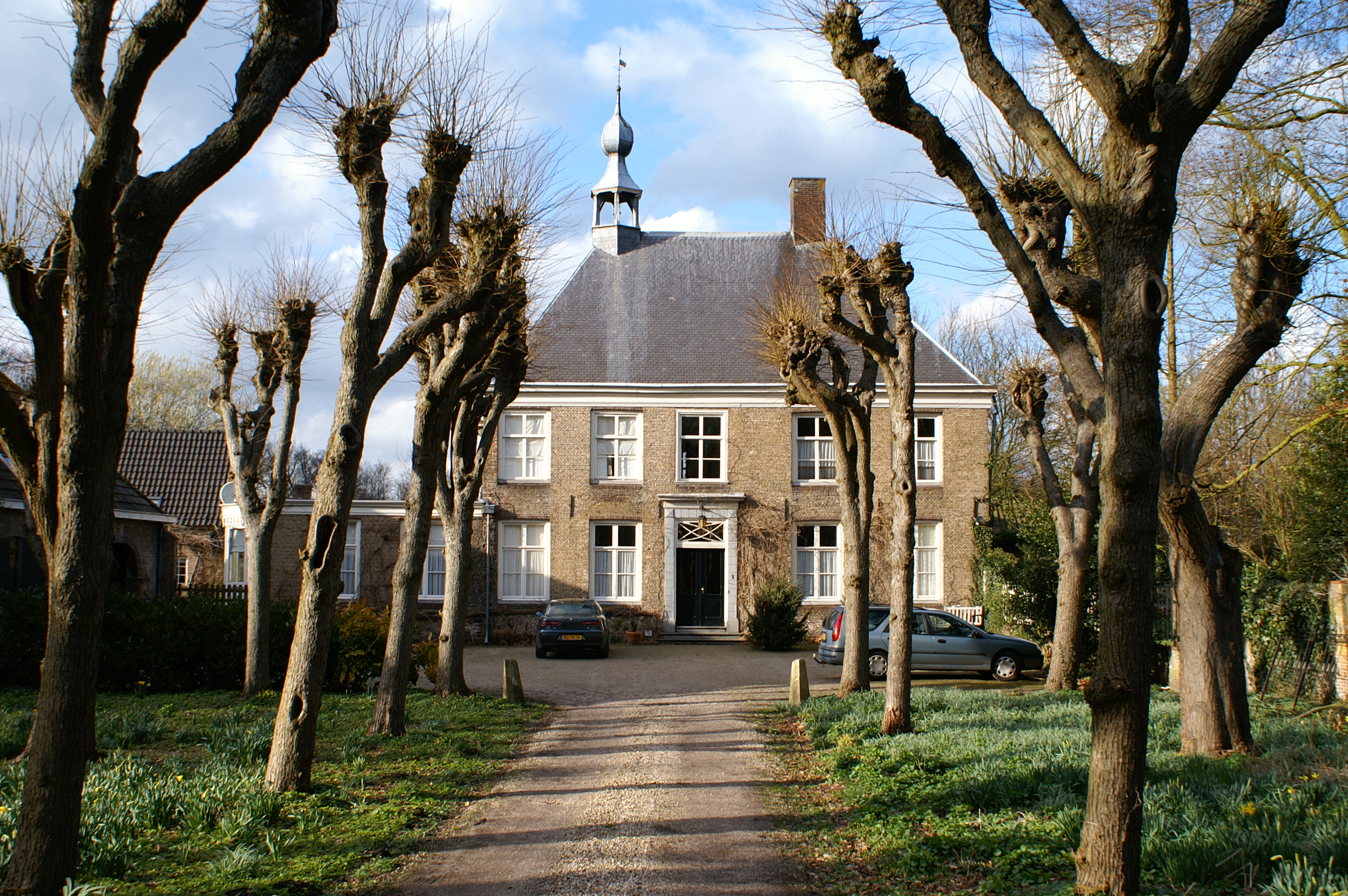
- Mansion Haanwijk in 2010

Site information
- Type: Castle
- Owner: Brabants Landschap

Location
- Haanwijk
- Coordinates: 51.654297°N 5.322554°E

Site history
- Built: 1649

Haanwijk is an estate and nature reserve with a manor house near Sint-Michielsgestel in North-Brabant, Netherlands.

== Nature Reserve ==
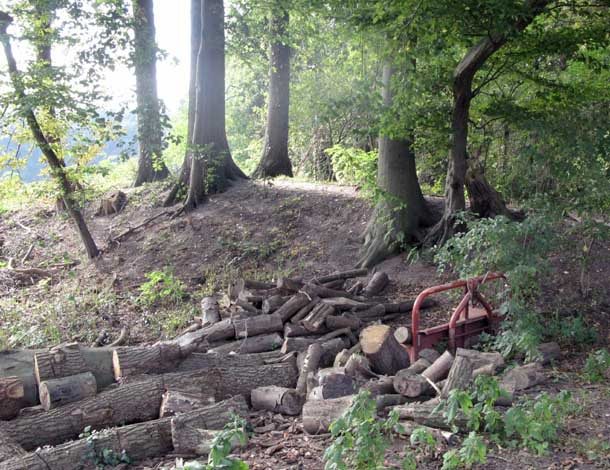
Dike near Haanwijk

The Haanwijk nature reserve that is now owned by Brabants Landschap measures 431 hectares. It is situated near the confluence of the Dommel and the Esschestroom. Haanwijk is connected to the nature reserves Sterrenbos, Pettelaar and Dooibroek.

The Sterrenbos of 80 hectares is home to the European badger and the Lily of the valley. The lane from Haanwijk to Halder is lined with planes. Here the longleaf speedwell is found. Pettelaar and Dooibroek sport 'donks' with mixed forest and lower lying sand and mires. The mires are used as grassland and are cut up in long parcels. The forests are connected by lanes, and the area still features many hedgerows (houtwallen)

The area is open to visitors, and a recreational walk is indicated by signs.

== Buildings ==
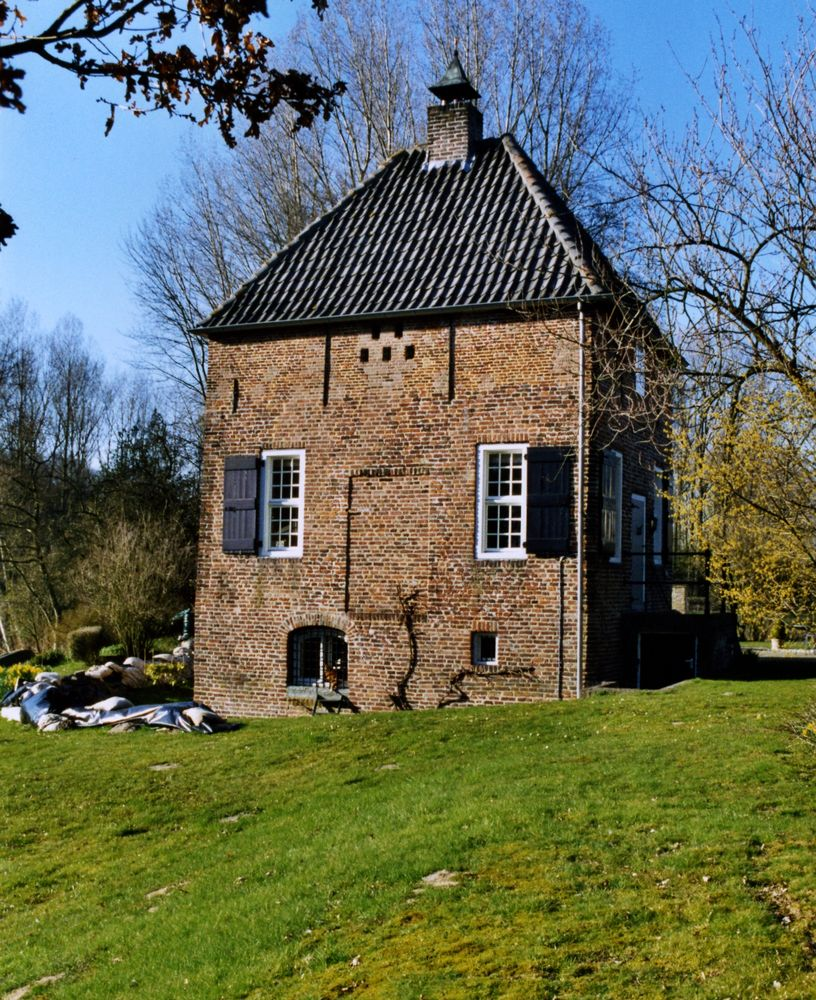
Tol- of veerhuis 't Vaantje te Haanwijk (2010)

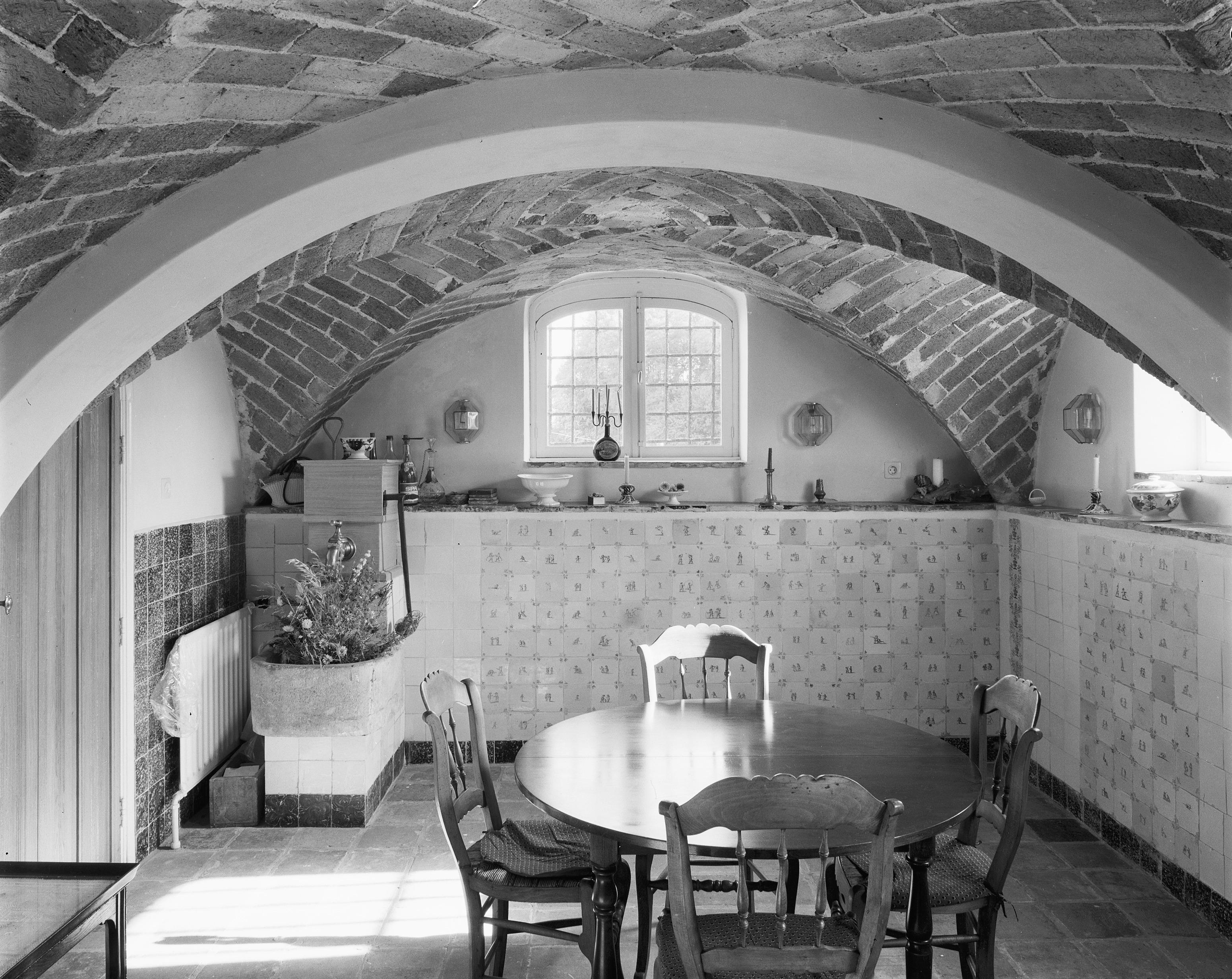
basement of 't Vaantje

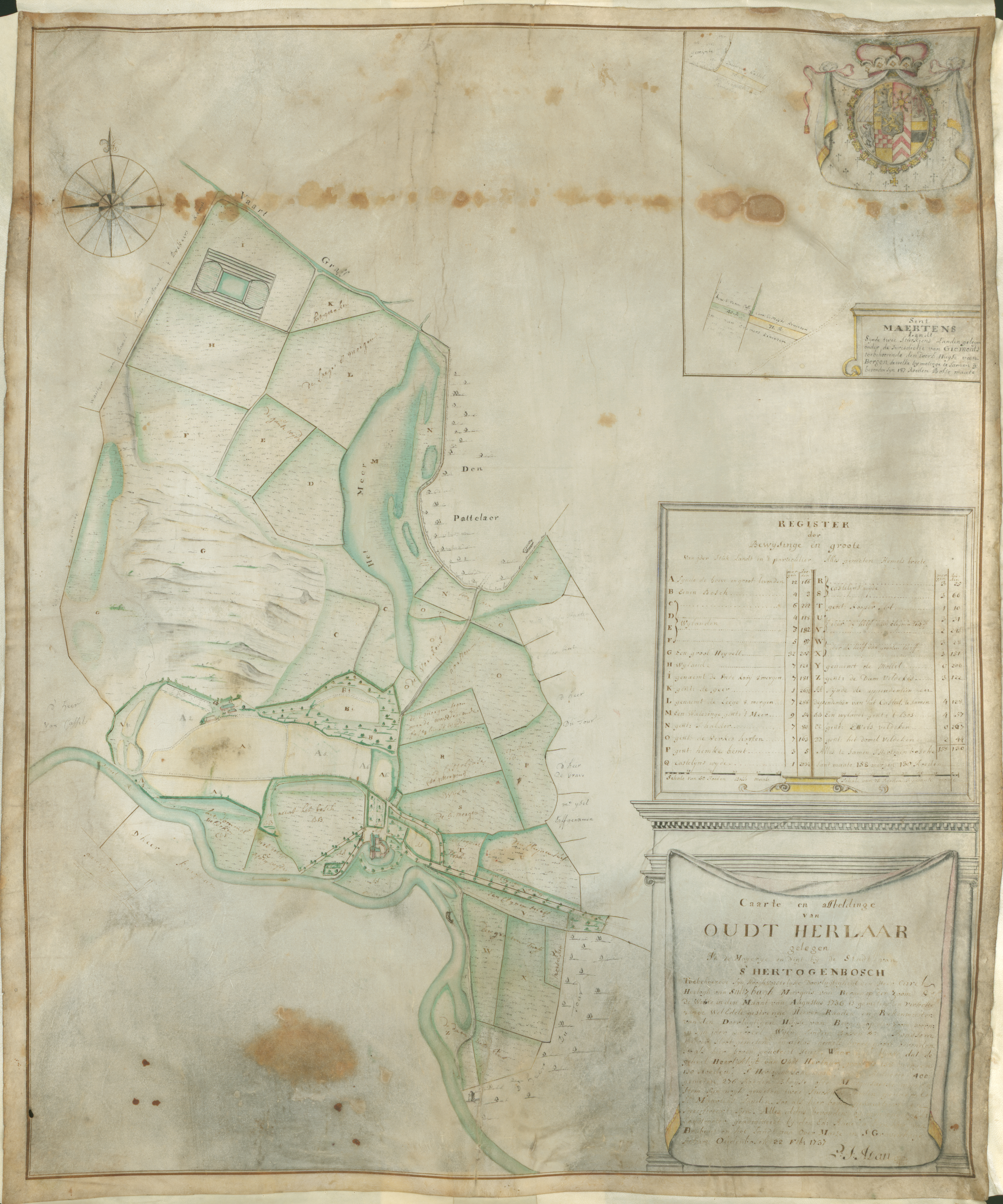
't Vaantje at the bottom of a 1736 map

The most prominent building at Haanwijk is the mansion. The mansion is a seventeenth-century brick building with a shingled roof. It used to be symmetrical, but in the nineteenth century the second level of the western part of the building was razed. This makes that the current building now has a strange extension without a story. On the roof is an onion shaped ridge turret. In 1769 Lieutenant Becker made a detailed map of Haanwijk. The current entrance of the mansion dates from 1834.

The farm at Haanwijk 2, which is connected to Haanwijk Mansion, dates from the eighteenth century. Close by is a probably also eighteenth century bakehouse.

After World War II, a barn was built next to the mansion's farm. It still has the sober style characteristic of the post war years. It now houses Museum Romeins Halder, dedicated to the important role of the nearby hamlet Halder in Roman times.

Veerhuis (ferry house) 't Vaantje is a mysterious building. Its floor plan resembles a small keep. While it was undoubtedly used as a ferry house for some time, there is little reason to suppose that it was built for that purpose. The name seems to have been derived from the name of nearby hill named Fennen or Fennrich Horstken.

The building is said to date from the 17th or 18th century. Others thought it the oldest brick building in the surroundings, and a medieval customs house. It appears as a keep and part of the Lord of Haanwijk's possessions on a 1736 map of Oud Herlaer. There are no indications that it was built during the lordship of Jacob Zweerts or his successors.

== History ==
=== A farm ===
There is a theory that Haanwijk was founded by members of the Herlaar family, known for the nearby castles of Oud Herlaer and, on the other side of the Dommel, Nieuw-Herlaer_Castle. A document dated 1306 refers to a Johan van Hanwic. If 'Hanwic' refers to Haanwijk, it is reasonable to suppose that at that time there was already a castle or manor present, but no proof has been found for this theory. In 1923 the owner of Haanwijk referred to the earlier discovery of foundations and basement arcs. Supposing that a convent had stood at Haanwijk earlier.

What is certain, is that at the time, there was a sizable farm in Haanwijk. In 1308 Haanwijk is mentioned as home of Arnold de Fine (van den Eynde), who sells a ground rent on the Hezelaar to Hendrik Swervegher. Multiple other contracts refer to a farm with ground rent at Haanwijk.

=== The farm bouwhoeve ===
A farm with a more specific label is the bouwhoeve. Ridder Eugène Ambroise de Maldeghem Baron of Leyschot (1627-1693) was married to Isabella Clara Eugenie van Kesselaer (1631-1715) in 1654. Isabella was the sole heiress of Hesther van Griensven, who had died in 1651. In 1658 Eugène Ambroise would sell a farm at Haanwijk in his capacity as husband of Isabella. This was referred to as the bouwhoeve. A 'bouwhoeve' translates as a farm, but the word is often used to denote a farm belonging to a manor.

Mathieu de Saugey was married to Walburch van Alendorp. Mathieu was a captain in the service of the Dutch Republic. After his death, his widow bought the bouwhoeve at Haanwijk from Eugène Ambroise de Maldeghem on 1 April 1658. Their children were Colonel Philippe de Saugey and Margaretha de Saugey. It seems that Philippe added something to the Bouwhoeve. In June 1682 Notary Daniel Boons sold to Aelbert van Eyl: "A nice farm at a good location at the plein in Haanwijk in Sint Michielsgestel. Consisting of a well proportioned (wel geapproprieerde) newly built stone house and bouwhoeve etc."

=== The Manor Haanwijk ===
Jacob Sweerts or Suerius (1587-1658) is considered to be the founder of Haanwijk manor. He held a very influential and profitable office (Raad en rentmeester-generaal domeinen in stad en Meierij van 's-Hertogenbosch) after the 1629 conquest of 's-Hertogenbosch by the Dutch Republic. In 1651 he bought the Haanwijk farm, and in 1652 he became a knight of the German Empire. In 1626 Jacob had married Johanna Lopez de Villanova (1595-1673), daughter of Marten Lopez de Villanova en Sarade Landas. He was succeeded by his sons Jacob and Maarten Sweerts de Landas.

In 1691 Lady Dariagiere de Elst Lady of Oorschot is mentioned as owner of Haanwijk. She was the wife of Reichsritter Maarten Christiaan Sweerts de Landas (1629-1704), Lord of Oirschot and Best from 1672. In 1717 their daughter Christina Clementia baroness Sweerts de Landas was mentioned as owner of Haanwijk. She would marry Marc Willem du Tour, who is mentioned as owner in 1719. His family would own Haanwijk till 1 June 1759.

In 1750 Christina Sweerts de Landas rented the manor to lieutenant-General Casimir Graf von Schlippenbach. At Haanwijk Schlippenbach would use his retirement to write his autobiography. He died at Haanwijk under suspicious circumstances.

On 1 June 1759 Christina Clementia Sweerts de Landas widow of Marc Willem du Tour sold Haanwijk to Colonel Onno Tamminga du Tour (1724-1779) for 22,0000 guilders. In 1777 Lady Anna Maria Bouwens, widow of Onno Tamminga owns Haanwijk.

In 1803 the De Senarclens de Grancy family appear as owners after marrying into the Tamminga family. In 1926 baron Guillaume Jules Antoine de Grancy and his wife died. They were succeeded by Nicolaas Johannes Bink (1897-1980), a lawyer who had married Bertha Louise Elise de Grancy (1890-1958), who was also a Doctor in law. Bink would restore het Vaantje. In 1984, Haanwijk was sold to Brabants Landschap a nature conservation society.

== Externe link ==
- Landgoed Haanwijk, brabantslandschap.nl
