= Oud Herlaer =

Remains of castle in the Netherlands

- Oud Herlaer
- Sint-Michielsgestel, the Netherlands
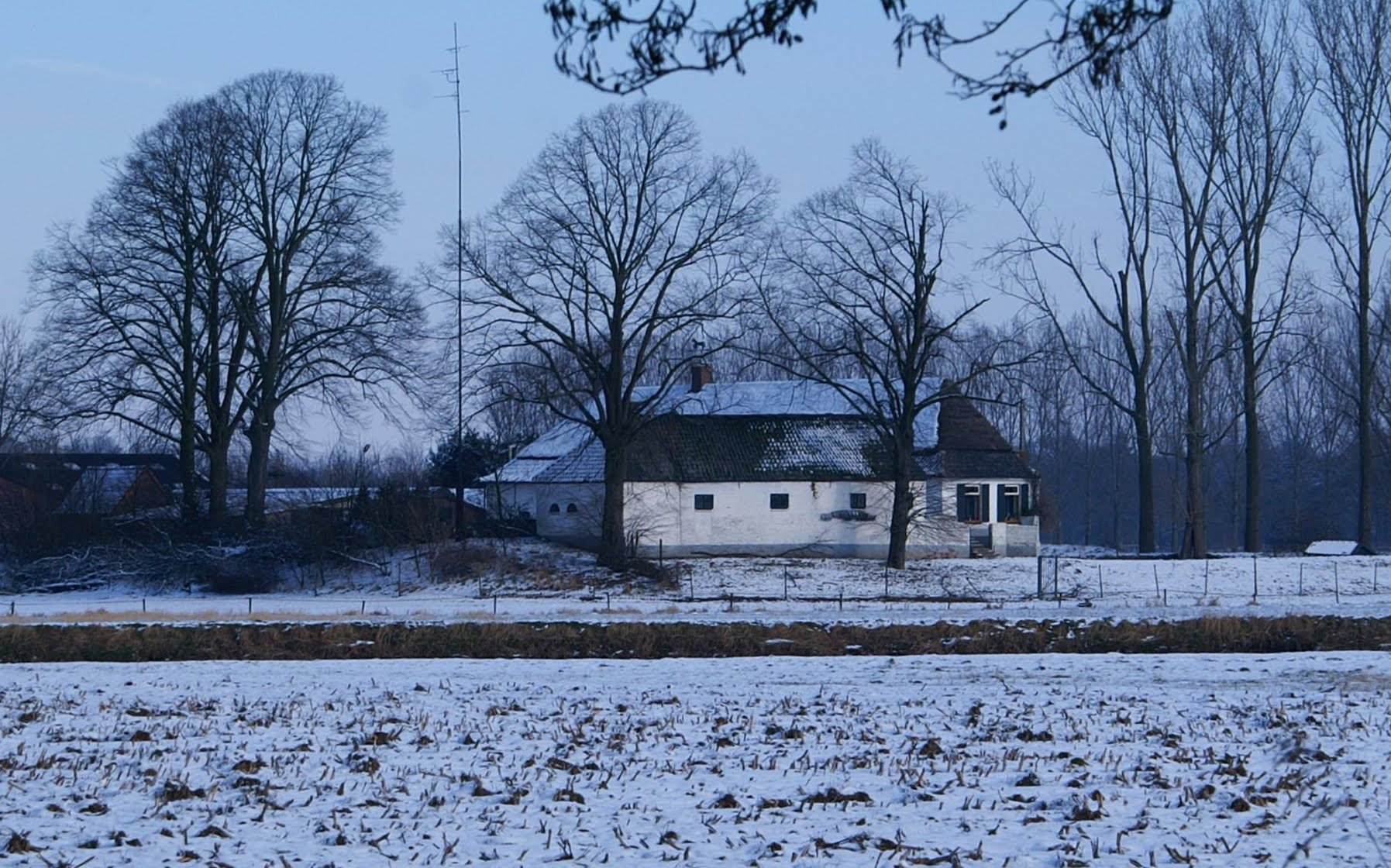
- Oud Herlaer in 2012

Site information
- Type: Castle
- Open to the public: No
- Condition: Farm contains fragments

Location
- The Netherlands
- Coordinates: 51.659846°N 5.312569°E

Site history
- Built: c. 1050

Oud Herlaer was a castle on the Dommel just east of Vught. All that remains is a farm which incorporates parts of the old castle. While not that much remains of the castle, there are a lot of recent studies about Oud Herlaer and its owners. The farm is planned to be opened as an art center in 2021. The name Oud Herlaer, (oud means 'old'), signifies that later on Nieuw-Herlaer Castle was built about 1 kilometer upstream.

== Location ==
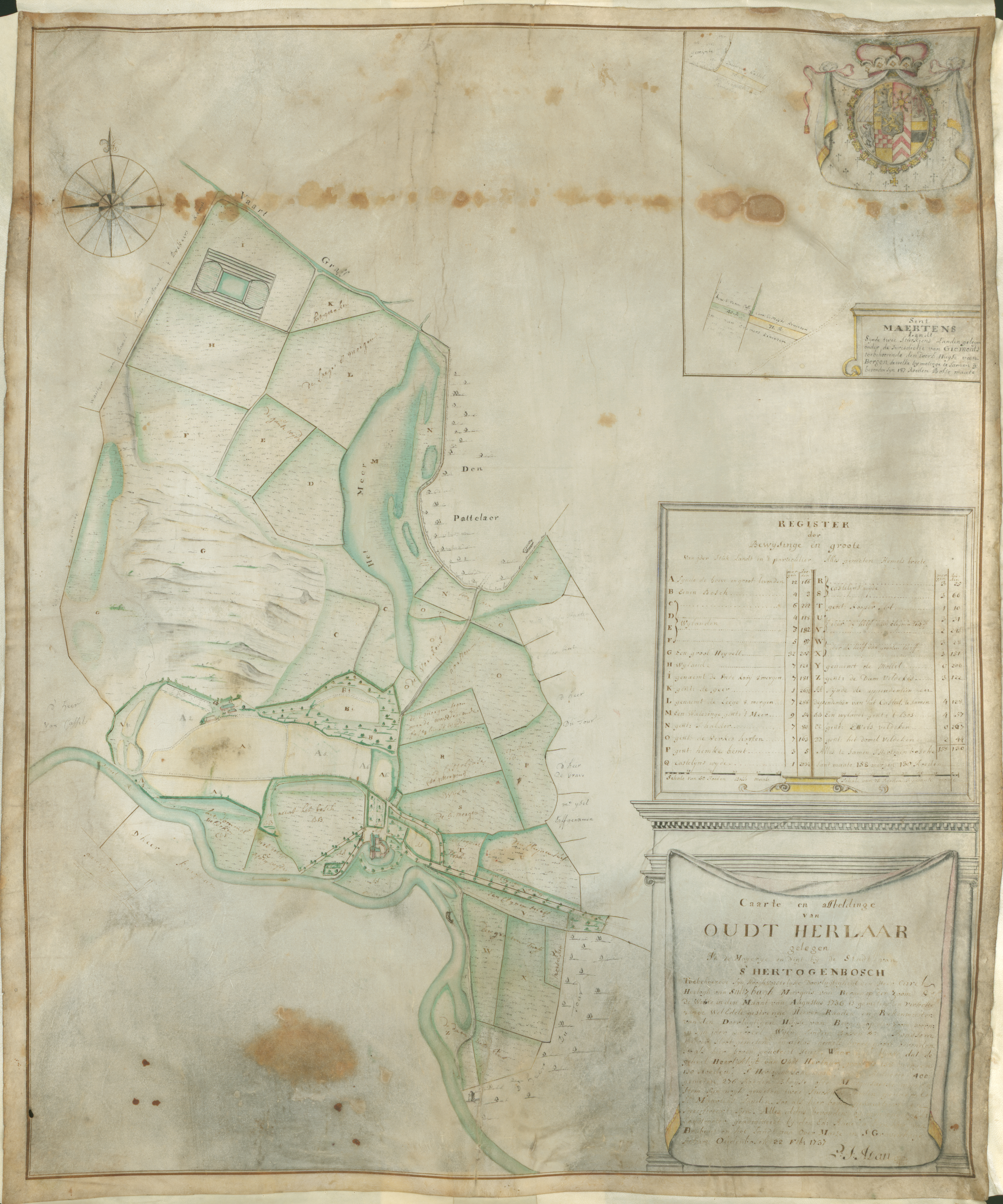
Oud Herlaer estate

Oud Herlaer is on the right bank of the Dommel. In medieval times it was in a very strategic position. The Dommel and its tributaries were practically the only way to efficiently transport bulky goods from north to south. On the other hand, the Dommel was an obstacle to east–west transport, except where there were bridges. The barrier function of the Dommel is illustrated by Oud Herlaer being within one kilometre of Maurick Castle in Vught, and actually being much closer to that place, but still belonging to the municipality of Sint-Michielsgestel.

The estate immediately around Herlaer was not very large (it still measured 120 hectares in 1737). A separate study has been done on the estate. It shows the many changes in this essentially man made landscape. The map of the estate shows the grounds that were closely connected to the castle. The total possessions of the Lords of Herlaer were spread over a much wider area.

The grounds were rather wet and interleaved with sand ridges. It made them only suitable for animal husbandry and digging peat. The lords of Herlaer also sold thousands of barge loads of sand. Much of this sand was used to expand the city center of 's-Hertogenbosch. Another source of income was the toll that the lords levied on traffic on the Dommel. There were probably also some watermills on the territory of Herlaer. The rise of 's-Hertogenbosch to become the second city of the Netherlands by about 1400 of course further increased the value of the estate.

== Building ==
=== The Motte and Bailey Castle ===
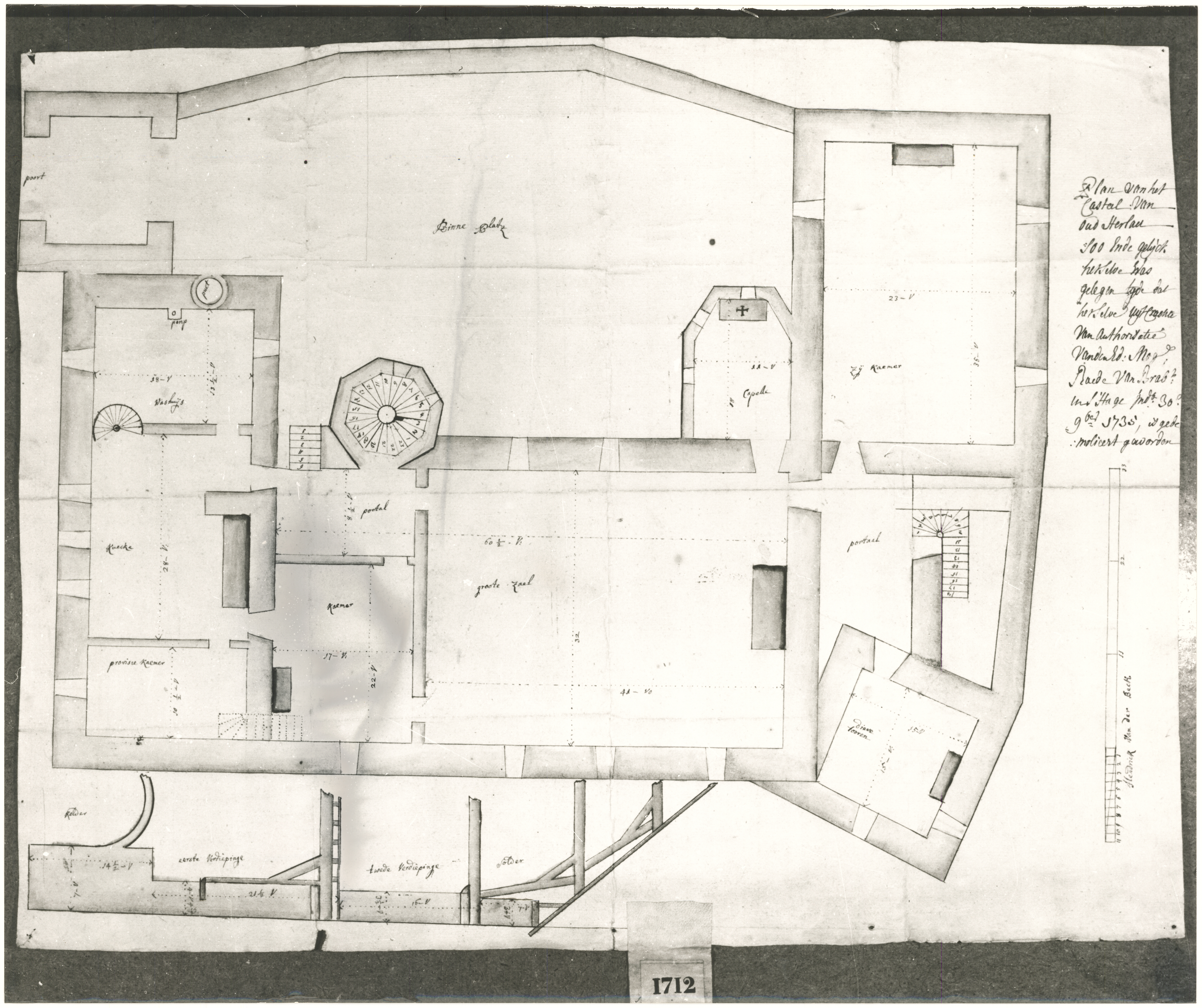
Floor plan in 1735

Oud Herlaer started out as a motte-and-bailey castle, probably already in the 11th century. This is indicated by the castle being situated on a natural sand ridge (dekzandwelving) which has been artificially heightened. I.e. on top of the sand ridge there are other sand layers which become slightly more than three meters thick in the center of the site, and are not a natural deposit. The lower layers of these could have been related to a motte castle. The diameter of the site is about 35-40 meter. It used to be connected to the nearby Dommel by two small canals which also refreshed the water in the moat.

The first pictures of the castle show a building with a round or polygonal wall on the east side. The castle moat is also consistently shown to be round. Round castles generally date from the period 1150–1350. It might indicate that the motte hill, which became obsolete c 1250 was surrounded by a brick wall. After that the ground could have been leveled. Direct proof for such a supposed phase is lacking, but it was a regular pattern.

The bailey or outer bailey of the motte castle has to be sought North-Northeast of the motte. An outer bailey is lacking on the old pictures of the castle. It had probably been demolished by that time, but its existence can be deduced from references to such a structure in archives.

=== The Medieval Castle ===
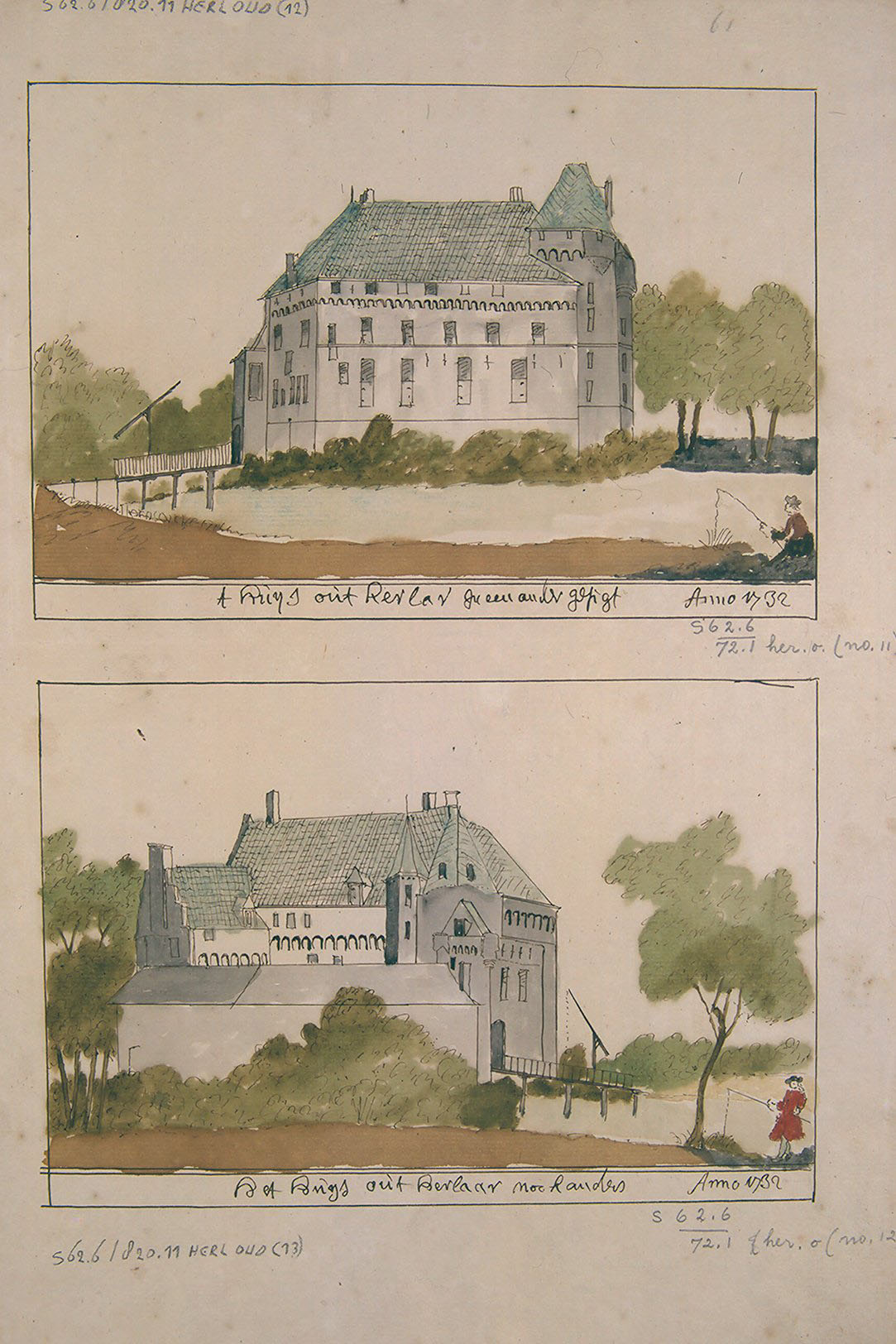
Oud Herlaer

The first written reference to the Oud Herlaer Castle dates from when it was sold in 1315. The first depiction of the castle dates from a painting made by Pauwels van Hillegaert in 1631, depicting the 1629 siege of 's-Hertogenbosch. It shows the castle from such a distance that it's not useful. The eighteenth century pictures are better, but not conclusive. They often show a round stone ring wall with a roof. A 1735 floor plan by Hendrick van der Beck, and an etching by Hendrik Spilman show this as a more polygonal structure.

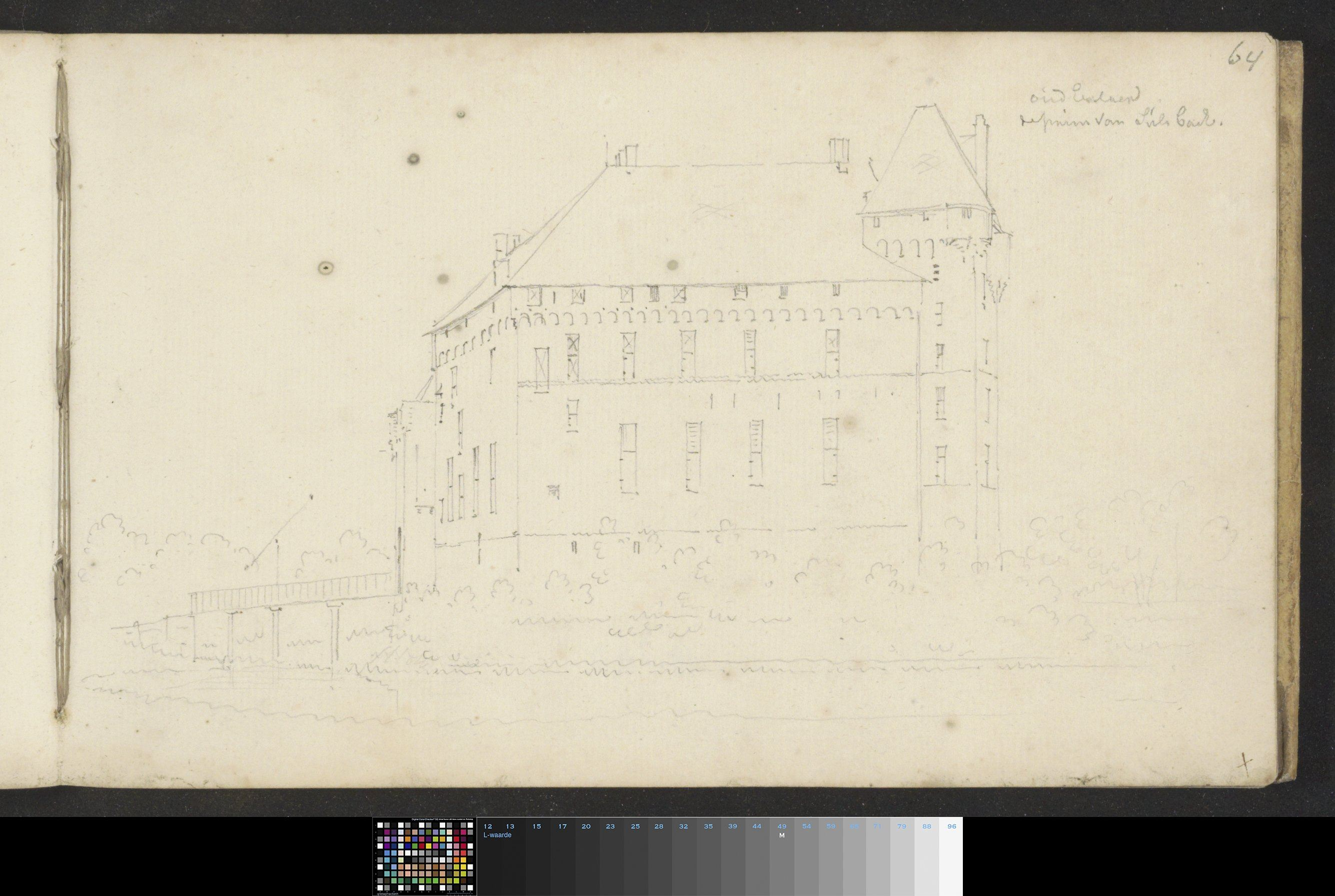
18th century drawing

By the seventeenth century castle was still an archetypical medieval castle with heavy towers and very thick walls. In the northeast corner was a gate building with small overhanging towers on an upper floor. On the east side was the ring wall that was so characteristic for Oud Herlaer. Some have it as a round wall, others as a more or less polygonal wall. This will likely be decided by archaeological excavations. All drawings depict the wall with a roof, but the floor plan does not, so the roof might have been only a cover for part of the courtyard.

The southeast wing probably had a basement, a ground floor, a first floor and an attic. It measured about 10.30 by 6.6 meters. On the southwest corner was the Dievetoren, which also had small overhanging towers. The western wall, which was part of the main building, was 25.5 m long, and had an octagonal stair tower on the courtyard side. The main floor of the main building was about 1.2 m above the courtyard. Below it was a basement. On the north west side was another structure.

The ring wall was probably the oldest part of the medieval castle, dating from the thirteenth century. The castle was probably changed after the sale in 1315. A second change set of changes (small overhanging towers and the Dievetoren) can be dated to the late 14th or early 15th century. Together with some sixteenth century changes these would then have led to the castle as it appeared in the 18th century.

=== Farm, or cottage Out Herlaer ===
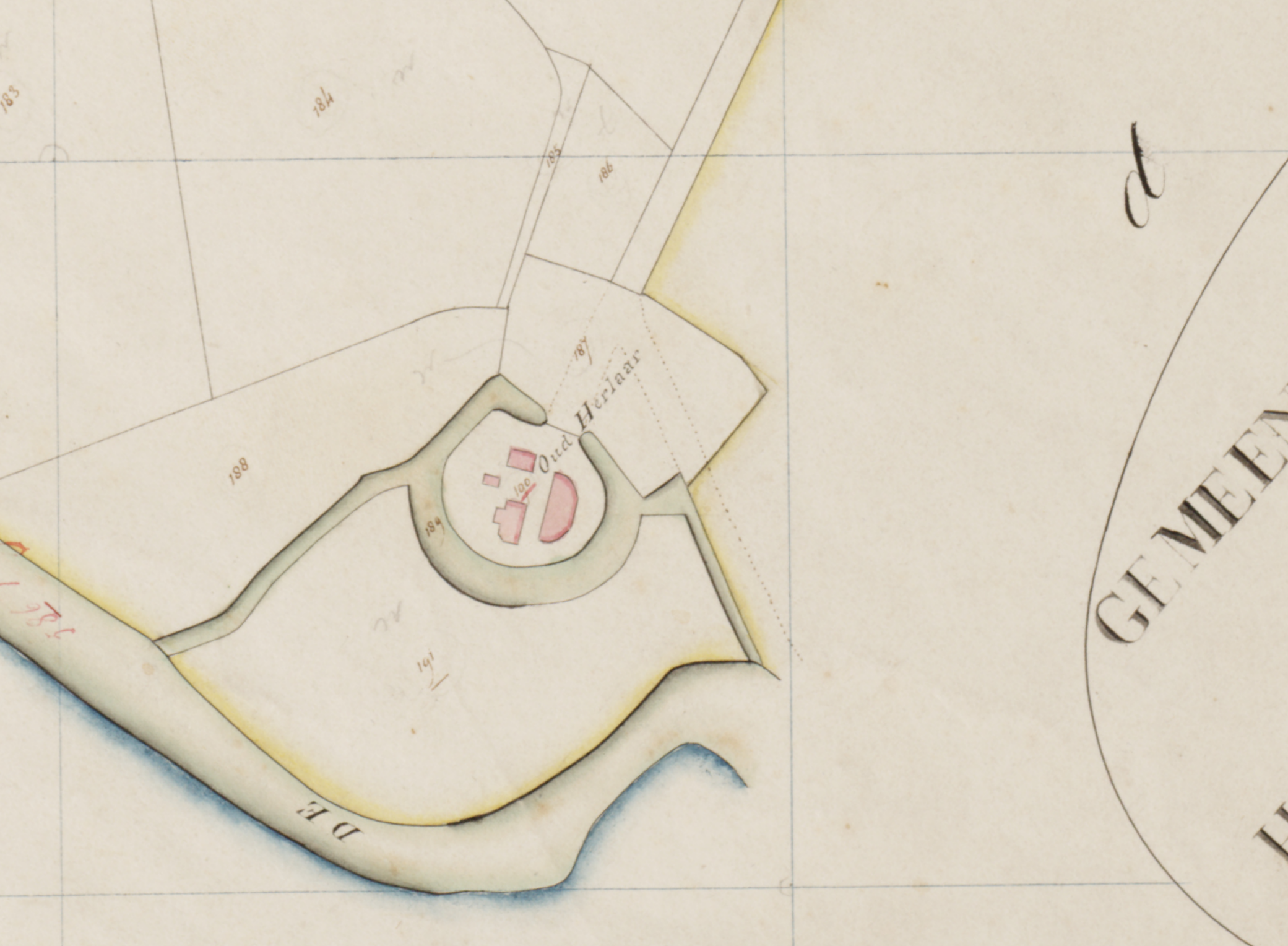
Oud Herlaer in 1811

It's not that clear what happened after the castle was demolished in 1737. By 1764 there was a farm on the premises, and the ruins had not yet been levied. A 1769 map shows a u-shaped farm. The 1811-1812 cadastre map of the area shows a farm building in the same position as the current farm. The presence of medieval wall fragments in the current farm suggests that parts of some of the castle walls were used to create this first farm on the premises. The map also shows the small canals which connected the Dommel to the castle moat.

By 1842 a baron used the site as a summer residence, and in that year a picture was made. In 1850 this 'cottage' burned down.

The current (2020) farm named Out Herlaer (with a 't') is claimed to date from the second half of the nineteenth century, but this is not certain. That is, it might be older. Nothing much happened at the site in the 19th and 20th centuries. In the second half of the twentieth century some minor structures were built on the main site, and modern stables were built on the (supposed) outer bailey. In the 1980s the surrounding moat and the small canals which refreshed it, were filled up. Meanwhile, the farm became a national monument.

=== Redevelopment of Oud Herlaer ===
In 2015 the farm was bought by Groen Ontwikkelfonds Brabant in order to preserve and promote the natural network, the main ecological structure and the ecological connection zones in the area. It led to the demolition of the modern stables on the (supposed) outer bailey. Discontinuing the farm was a simple and effective step to further these goals. A thorough archaeological reconnaissance of the terrain by BAAC Onderzoeks- en Adviesbureau was published in 2016. Based on this information the old castle moat was restored in 2017.

After the basic situation had been (re)-established, the next steps were not that obvious. Groen Ontwikkelfonds decided to engage the help of public to determine these. Organizations were allowed to subscribe to buy the lands based on their plans. In 2017 the nature preservation organization Brabants Landschap won the tender with a plan to combine nature, art and history. Oud Herlaer will become a work- and exposition place for artists. The original structure of the castle, i.e. castle, outer bailey and orchard will be restored. Perhaps some archaeological remains will be made visible. Eco-art objects will be placed on the terrain. Around the castle the natural bed of the Dommel might be restored. A lot of connected wet and dry nature will be created. The recreational facilities in the wider area will be upgraded, and car-traffic will be discouraged.

Jan Baan of Brabants Landschap was very enthusiastic about the plan. Baan stated that the remains would be made visible, and that the farm would be used for expositions. The surrounding nature would be the third pillar of the plan. He cited the jury of tender as stating that the plan had the potential of a Kröller-Müller Museum of the south. Bas Aarts, president of the society Friends of the Brabant Castles was a bit reserved. He liked the restoration of the moat and the excavations. Apart from that, he hoped that the plan would be beneficial to everybody. I.e. that visitors would be able to see what castle had been like.

== History ==
=== The Van Herlaer family (?-1315) ===
Old Herlaer was the center of the Lordship Herlaer. The Herlaer family held it free of feudal obligations. Cf. the inheritance via the female line. The Lords of Herlaer were also stewards of territory owned by the Abbey of Echternach and later the Prince-Bishopric of Liège. In time they acquired a lot of territory in the vicinity, or got such ecclesial territory on loan. However, ideas that the Van Herlaer's usurped ecclesial goods are probably false.

From about 1080 the connection between family names and estate names became usual in the Holy Roman Empire. The name 'Van Herlaer' starts to appear in sources shortly after, often with the first name 'Dirk'. In 1173 the title 'Lord of Herlaer' (Heer van Herlaer) appears for the first time. It meant that the Lord of Herlaer held judicial power in the area. About 10 generations of the Van Herlaer family can be deduced from old sources.

In the mid-twelfth century the Van Herlaer's became Lords of Ameide. Ameide was a loan from the Bishop of Utrecht. The Van Herlaer's then moved their seat over there. The eldest sister of the Lord of Ameide probably inherited Oud Herlaer in 1305. In 1306 she gave it to her husband Gerard van Loon. He was the last Lord of Herlaer related to the original Herlaer's, and sold the Oud Herlaer estate in 1315. Even though the presence of the Van Herlaer's on Oud Herlaer was ended this way, the family continued to be successful. Gerard or his son would shortly after acquire a rather big continuous territory in the Bommelerwaard. Gerard's son Dirk van Herlaar (1312-1354) continued the Van Herlaer line as Lord of Ameide.(Heer van Ameide)

=== The Van Horne and Rotselaer families (1315-1524) ===
In 1315 Gerard I of Horne heer van Altena (1270-1331) bought Herlaer, bringing it into the Van Horne family. In 1316 he married his second wife Irmgard of Kleef. She owned Oud Herlaar from 1330 to 1357. Their son Dirk of Horne Lord of Perwijs and Herlaer (1320-1378) became the next Lord of Herlaer. His line would become known as that of the Lords Perwijs and Herlaer.

There are conflicting reports on the Horne's of Herlaer. Jan of Horne (1395- 28 June 1447) married Maheal of Reifferscheidt in 1420. In about 1433 he inherited Herlaer from Maria of Horne. He had four children: Hendrik II, Isabel, Maria and Aleid (married to Jan of Merode). Hendrik II of Horn (c. 1422 - 22 mei 1483) would succeed his father as Lord of Perwijs and Herlaer. Probably under a usufruct for his siblings, because in 1446 there was mention of a dowry which had been possessed by Isabel.

Isabel of Horne had married Jan IV of Rotselaer (?-1450/51) in 1445. (She also married Jan Pinnoc, and Jan Brant) Together they got Jan V of Rotselaer (?-1496), married to Clementina of Bouchout in 1482, and Johanna of Rotselaer. Jan V and Clementina got Hendrik van Vorsselaer and Isabella. On 13 February 1479 Jan V of Rotselaer transferred the Lordship of Herlaer and Gestel to Herman of Counen of Zegenwerp. Herman would not continue his possession of Herlaer. On 25 March 1507 Clementina of Bouchout got the (a?) usufruct on Herlaer. However, the children of Clementina died childless, and so the possession by the Van Rotselaer's ended.

=== The Van Merode family (1524-1662) ===
Hendrik of Merode was invested with the Lordship of Oud Herlaer in 1524. He was a son of Rijkalt, who was a son of Jan I of Merode and Aleit of Horne. In a conflict about the succession Hendrik of Merode had won against a number of other contestants. Hendrik married Francisca of Brederode and got Jan IV baron of Merode, Pietersheim, Perwijs and Duffel and lord of Herlaer. Jan IV married Mensia of Bergen, daughter of the Marquess of Bergen op Zoom in 1558. Their daughter Maria Margareta of Merode married Johan IV Corsselaar van Wittem (c. 1550-1588) and became Marquess of Bergen op Zoom by inheritance. She died before her father, and so her daughters inherited from her father.

The title Marquess of Bergen op Zoom was a high distinction. However, in the Eighty Years' War the city of Bergen op Zoom sided with the Dutch Republic, and Jan van Wittem switched to the Spanish side in 1581. The result was that the States of Brabant made William the Silent Marquess of Bergen op Zoom. In the later stages of the Eighty Years' War the territory gradually came under complete control of the Republic, meaning that the title did not have much real value.

In 1601 Herlaer was inherited by the three daughters of Johan IV Corsselaar van Wittem. In 1610 one of these daughters, Maria Margareta of Merode, called Margaretha van Wittem van Beersel (1582-1627), became sole proprietor of Oud Herlaer. In 1612 she married Count Hendrik van den Bergh, lord of Stevensweert. In 1627 her daughter Maria Elisabeth II van den Bergh (1613-1671) inherited Herlaer.

It's remarkable that Oud Herlaer survived the sieges of 's-Hertogenbosch unscathed. After all, it was still a defensible point, and was very close to Den Bosch. Therefore, the defenders of 's-Hertogenbosch could have used it to delay a siege, and the besiegers could have destroyed it after one of the failed sieges. During the 1629 Siege of 's-Hertogenbosch Frederick V of the Palatinate stayed at Oud Herlaer while commander Maurice, Prince of Orange stayed at nearby Maurick Castle. After the conquest of 's-Hertogenbosch by the Dutch Republic, Count Hendrik van den Bergh changed to the Dutch side in 1632. The fact that by then Herlaar was under control of the Republic might have influenced this decision.

Count Hendrik van den Bergh's surviving daughter Maria Elisabeth II van den Bergh (1613-1671), Marchioness of Bergen op Zoom inherited the Marquesat of Bergen op Zoom in 1633. She married Eitel Friedrich V, Prince of Hohenzollern-Hechingen in 1641, and had only a daughter Henriette Françoise.

In or before 1645 Oud Herlaer was described by Baron Philips of Leefdael as belonging to Lady ... de Berges, Princess of Hogensolre (Hohenzollern). He also stated that she owned three water mills in the area, one mill for threshing wheat, one for fulling cloth and one for processing leather.

=== De la Tour d'Auvergne (1662-1728) ===
In 1662 Henriette Françoise married Frederic Maurice de la Tour d'Auvergne Duke of Bouillon (1642-1707). (he was a son of Frédéric Maurice de La Tour d'Auvergne, Duc de Bouillon (1605-1652)). They got Emanuel Maurice (Lord of Herlaer 1698-1701), and François Egon (Lord of Herlaer 1701-1710). In 1707 François Egon married Maria Anna Duchess of Aremberg and Aerschot (?-1710). They got only Marie Henriette de la Tour d'Auvergne (Lade of Herlaer 1710-1728).

=== Sulzbach family (1728-1798) ===
In 1728 Charles III Philip, Elector Palatine became Lord of Herlaer. He was succeeded by Charles Theodore, Elector of Bavaria (1724-1799), who was lord of Herlaer from 1743 to 1798. In 1798 the Lordship of Herlaer was destroyed.
