= Laar, Sint-Michielsgestel =

Laar
- Hamlet
- Location in the province of North Brabant in the Netherlands Laar (Netherlands)
- Coordinates: 51°40′27″N 5°25′30″E
- Country: Netherlands
- Province: North Brabant
- Municipality: Sint-Michielsgestel
- Time zone: UTC+1 (CET)
  - Summer (DST): UTC+2 (CEST)
- Postal code: 5258
- Dialing code: 073

Laar is a hamlet in the Dutch province of North Brabant. It is located in the municipality of Sint-Michielsgestel, 2 km east of the town of Berlicum.

Laar is not a statistical entity, and the postal authorities have placed it under Berlicum. It has no place signs, and consists of about 85 houses.

It was first mentioned in 1866 as Laar, and means "forest meadow".
