= Halder, Netherlands =

Halder
- Hamlet
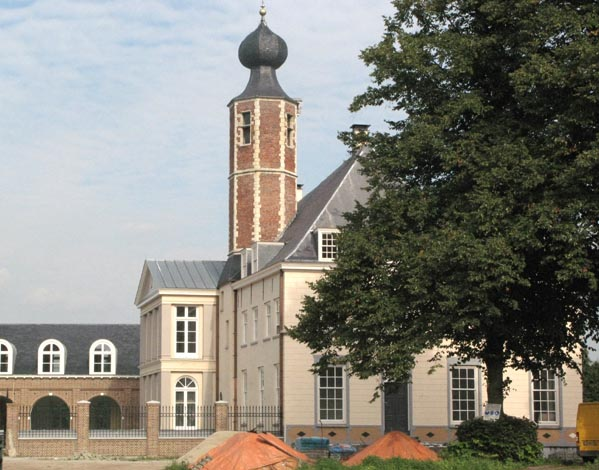
- The restored Herlaar Castle

- Location in the province of North Brabant in the Netherlands Halder (Netherlands)
- Coordinates: 51°39′N 5°19′E
- Country: Netherlands
- Province: North Brabant
- Municipality: Sint-Michielsgestel

Area
  - Total: 0.17 km^{2} (0.066 sq mi)

Population (2021)
  - Total: 70
  - Density: 410/km^{2} (1,100/sq mi)
- Time zone: UTC+1 (CET)
  - Summer (DST): UTC+2 (CEST)
- Postal code: 5271
- Dialing code: 073

Halder is a hamlet in the Dutch province of North Brabant. It is located in the municipality of Sint-Michielsgestel, between the towns of Sint-Michielsgestel and Vught.

The hamlet was first mentioned in 1087 as Herlar, and is a combination of "forest meadow" and "army". It takes its name from the castle. Halder has place name signs. It was home to 312 people in 1840.

Nieuw Herlaar Castle is a 19th-century monastery, however it contains the 15th-century tower of the old castle.
