= Sint-Michielsgestel =

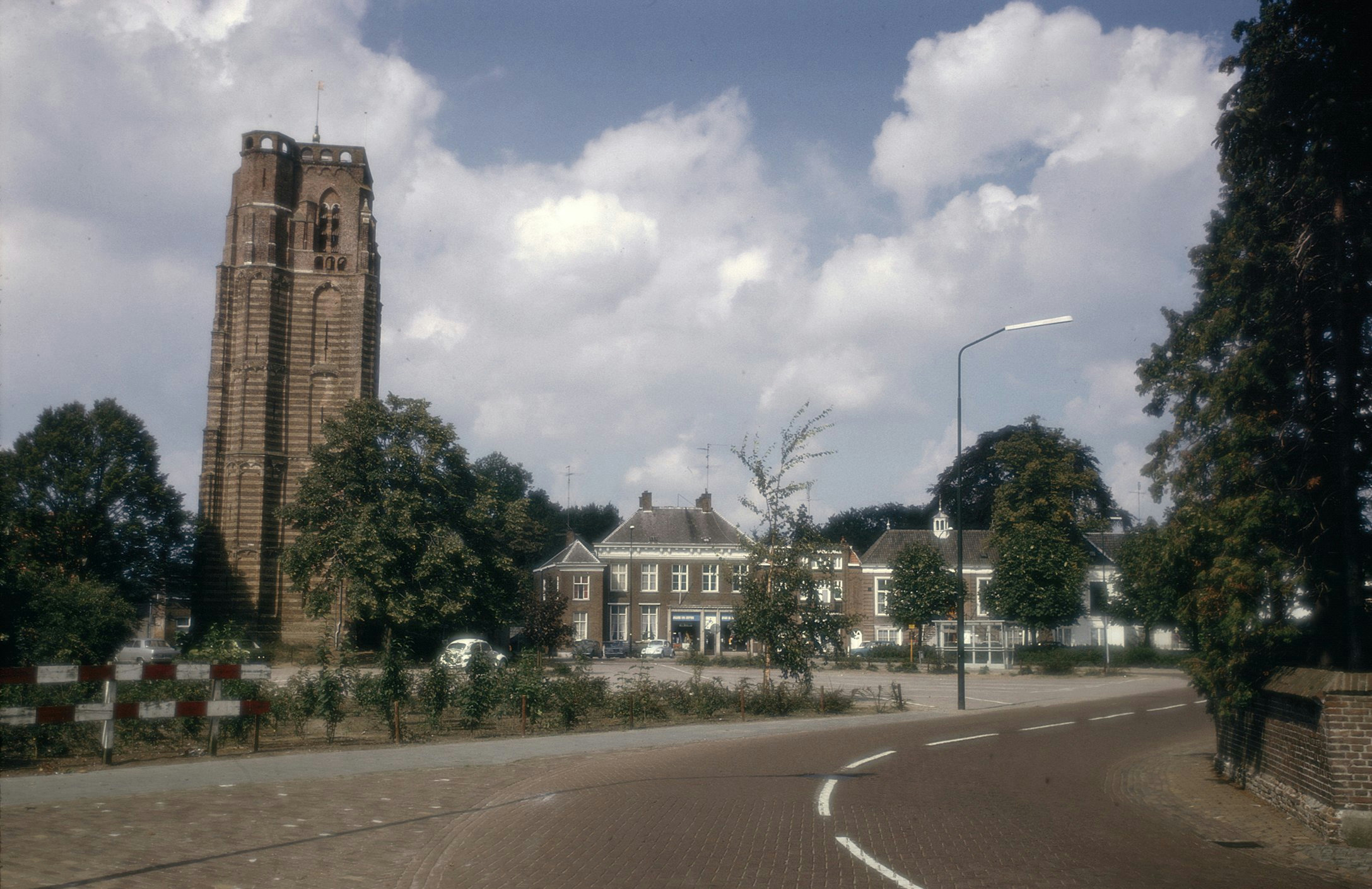
- Center with the Oude Toren in Sint-Michielsgestel

- Flag Coat of arms
- Interactive map of Sint-Michielsgestel
- Coordinates: 51.638439°N 5.349792°E
- Country: Netherlands
- Province: North Brabant
- Municipality: Sint-Michielsgestel (municipality)

Population (1 January 2020)
  - Total: 12,370

Sint-Michielsgestel (Dutch pronunciation: [ˈsɪnt miˌxilsˈxɛstəl]) is a village in the municipality of Sint-Michielsgestel, Netherlands.

== Geography ==
The 120 km long river Dommel flows north from a well near Peer in Belgium. Just north of 's-Hertogenbosch it is joined by the Aa and joins the Meuse as Dieze. It currently divides Sint-Michielsgestel in two parts. In the past the Dommel was important as a transport axis and had crucial influence on the village's history.

== History ==
=== Antiquity ===
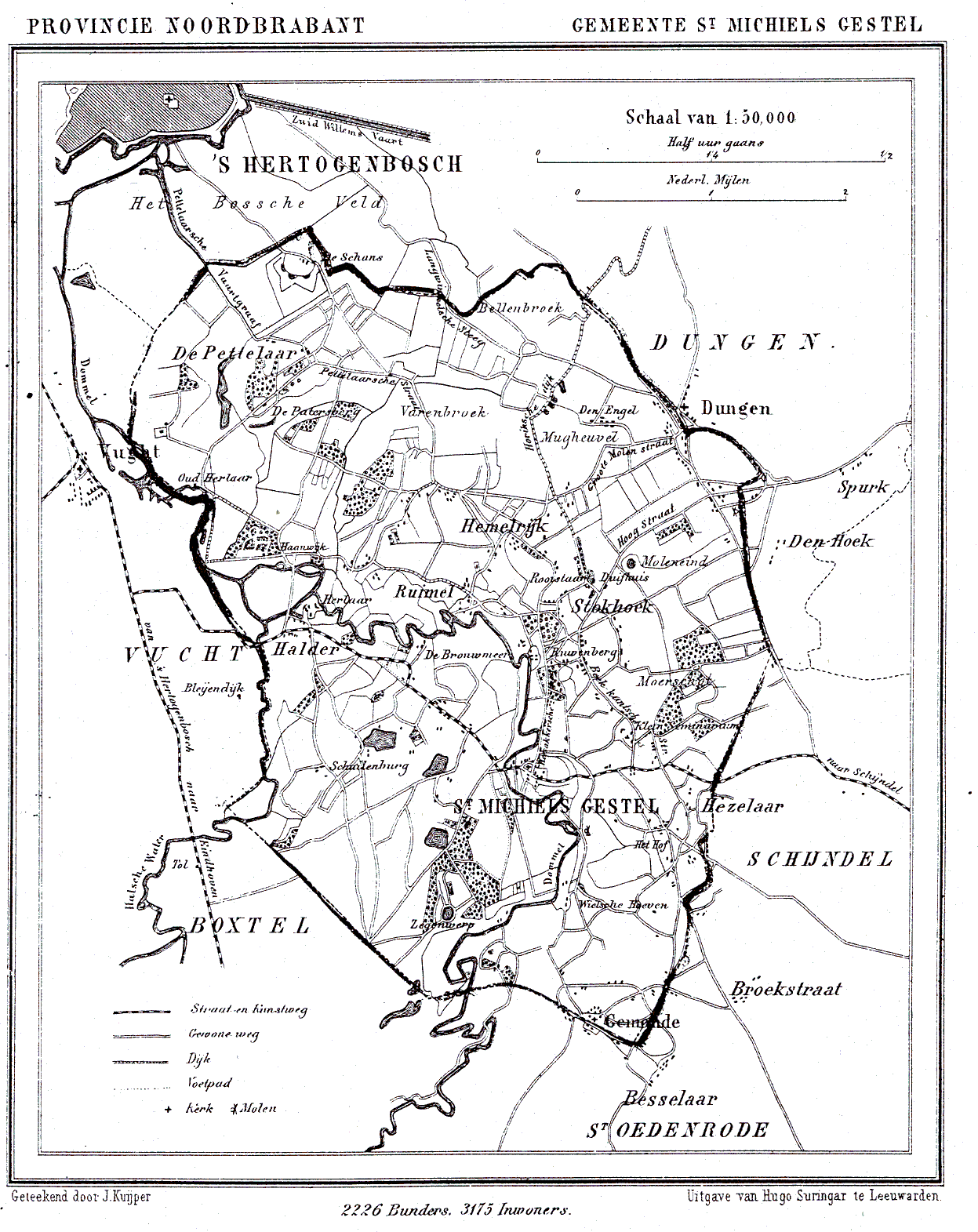
1866 map of Sint-Michielsgestel

Archeological finds near the hamlet of Halder prove that the hamlet Halder was probably the most important settlement on the Dommel during the Roman era. Thousands of Roman coins were found in 1962 not far from Nieuw Herlaer castle. These and other local archeological finds are now on display in the Museum Romeins Halder at Haanwijk.

=== Medieval times ===
The current center of Sint-Michielsgestel is not the same as the medieval center. Right into the 15th century, there were references to 'Gestel near Herlaar'. The economic center of the parish was in the current hamlet Halder, with its water mills. In Halder was also the ruined motte-and-bailey castle of Oud Herlaer, which probably dates from the 11th or 12th century. The associated Lords of Herlaer start to get mentioned from 1079. During medieval times several castles and other moated sites were built in vicinity of Sint-Michielsgestel.

The importance of the village Sint-Michielsgestel probably stems from the possibility to safely cross the Dommel. The remains of a wooden 10th-century church were found at the foot of the church tower Oude toren in the village. The church of Sint-Michielsgestel is dedicated to the archangel St. Michael, and this was already the case in medieval times. Remains of another 10th-century church were found in the hamlet Ruimel, between Halder and Herlaer.

In the village name, 'Gestel' is a concatenation of Geest, meaning sandy ground at a higher level, and (Loo), meaning forest. In other words an elevated sandy ground in the forest. The prefix 'Sint-Michiels' comes in handy, because in Brabant there are multiple places named Gastel/Gestel. The first certain reference to the village (Sint-Michiels)gestel dates from 1281.

Its name was first mentioned when the estates or heerlijkheden Herlaer and Gestel were joined c. 1314 AD.

=== Kingdom of the Netherlands ===
The French period would prove disastrous for the many castles and manors. For the Catholics in the area it brought freedom of religion, and in 1799 they established a seminary in what was left of Nieuw-Herlaer Castle. When the Netherlands regained their independence, a preparatory small seminary was founded in the village in 1815. It is the precursor of Gymnasium Beekvliet.

=== World War II ===
During World War II this facility was used as prison-camp, along with the grootseminarie in Haaren. On 4 May 1942 the Germans imprisoned 460 Dutch men in Beekvliet. All were political prisoners or prominent in Dutch society. Luuk van Driel, father of the famous Tim and Dirk, also known as 'grote spelers', escaped with others by calling the police. They became local heroes after this. Amongst the prisoners were writers Simon Vestdijk and Anton van Duinkerken. Political prisoners included Wim Schermerhorn (Prime Minister 1945–1946), Willem Banning, Pieter Geyl and Jan de Quay, all post-war politicians.

== Attractions ==
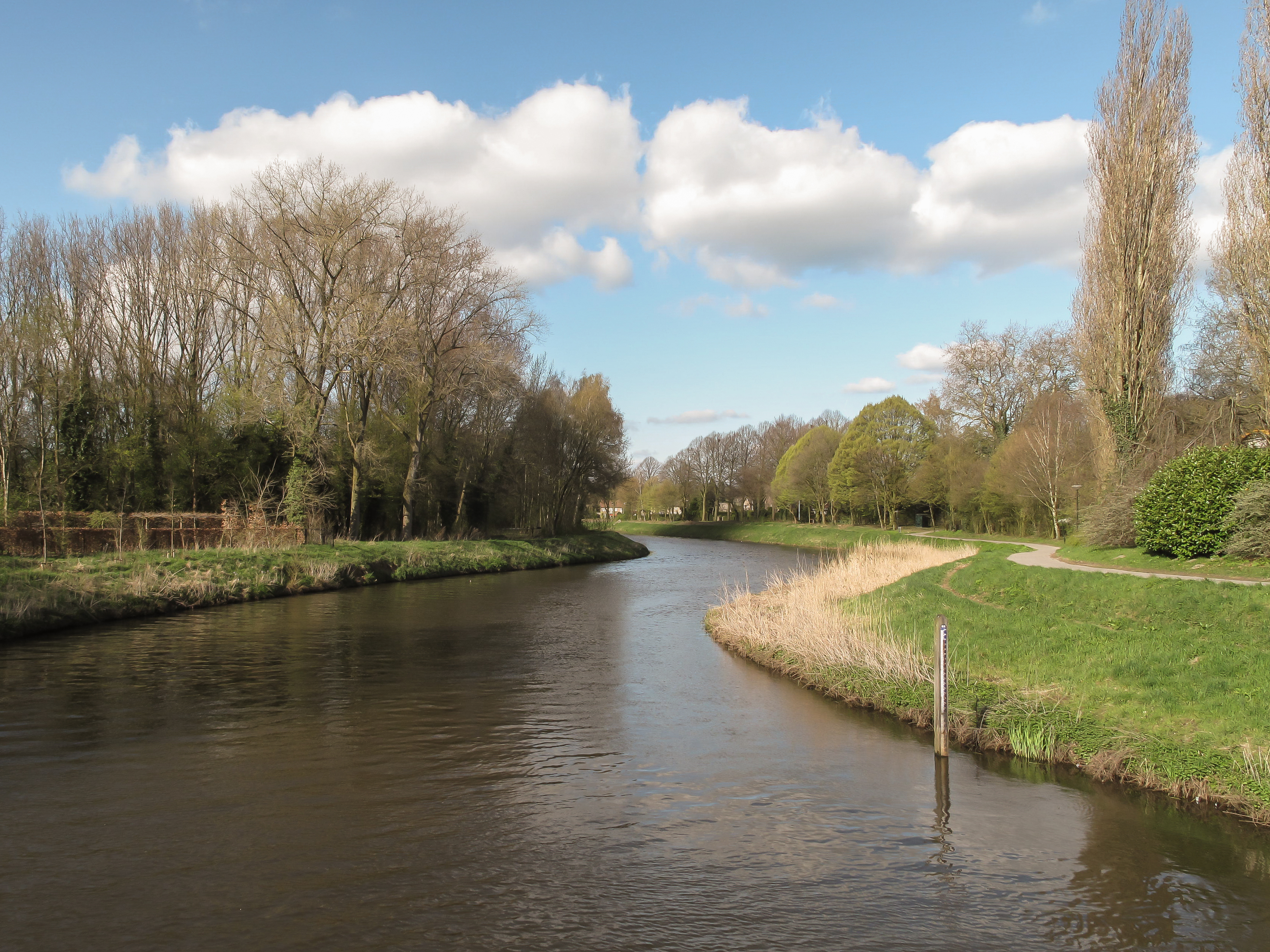
The Dommel near Sint Michielsgestel

The Petrus Dondersplein is the central square of the village, close to the Dommel. It has two major monuments. The Oude toren (old tower) is a nice 15th-century church tower made with alternating rows of brick and tuff stone. The Protestant church was built in 1808, when the Protestant minority had to return the big church to the Catholics. After the main church connected to the Oude toren had to be demolished, a new St. Michael's was built on Nieuwstraat. This is a well preserved example of 1930s church architecture. The imposing former institute for the deaf is on the western side of the Dommel at Theerestraat. It dates from 1908, and as institute for the deaf it is a rare building.

Sint-Michielsgestel and surroundings are best known for the many (former) castles and manors.

- Little remains of the great castle at Oud Herlaer, but it will be a museum in the future.
- Nieuw-Herlaer Castle was a true castle. It is now a manor with a 15th-century stair tower, and an 18th-century wing.
- Haanwijk is a well-preserved 16th-century manor, which includes some other buildings, and the small Museum Romeins Halder.
- The Grote Ruwenberg near Ruimel was a moated manor, later a school, and now a conference venue. The tower is part of the original manor.
- The Kleine Ruwenberg is a 19th-century mansion which replaced a 15th-century manor.

The above attractions do not attract many visitors to Sint-Michielsgestel, although many spend the night there in order to visit nearby 's-Hertogenbosch. Lacking major attractions, the area has to rely on nature, and the cultural history reflected in castles and farms. This makes the municipality focus on outdoor activities, including cycling, running and horse-riding that are already popular with the locals.

== Transport ==
Sint-Michielsgestel is located near the central transport axis in the Netherlands, between 's-Hertogenbosch and Eindhoven. Nowadays this axis is dominated by the A2 motorway, but towards 's-Hertogenbosch, the village has an even more direct access via the N617.The village has grown by suburbanization.

== Services ==
There is little industry in the village. A major employer in Sint-Michielsgestel is Kentalis, a resource centre for sensory and communicative disabled people formerly known as Institute for the deaf and hearing impaired called Instituut voor Doven. Gymnasium Beekvliet is a popular school that attracts many students from outside the village.

== Sport ==
Sint-Michielsgestel is a major venue for Cyclo-cross. Stichting Wielerbelang Sint-Michielsgestel (SWG) organizes major cyclo-cross events in the village since 1974. The absolute highlight was the 2000 UCI Cyclo-cross World Championships won by local Richard Groenendaal. The Dutch National Cyclo-cross Championships have been held in the village five times.

== Notable people ==
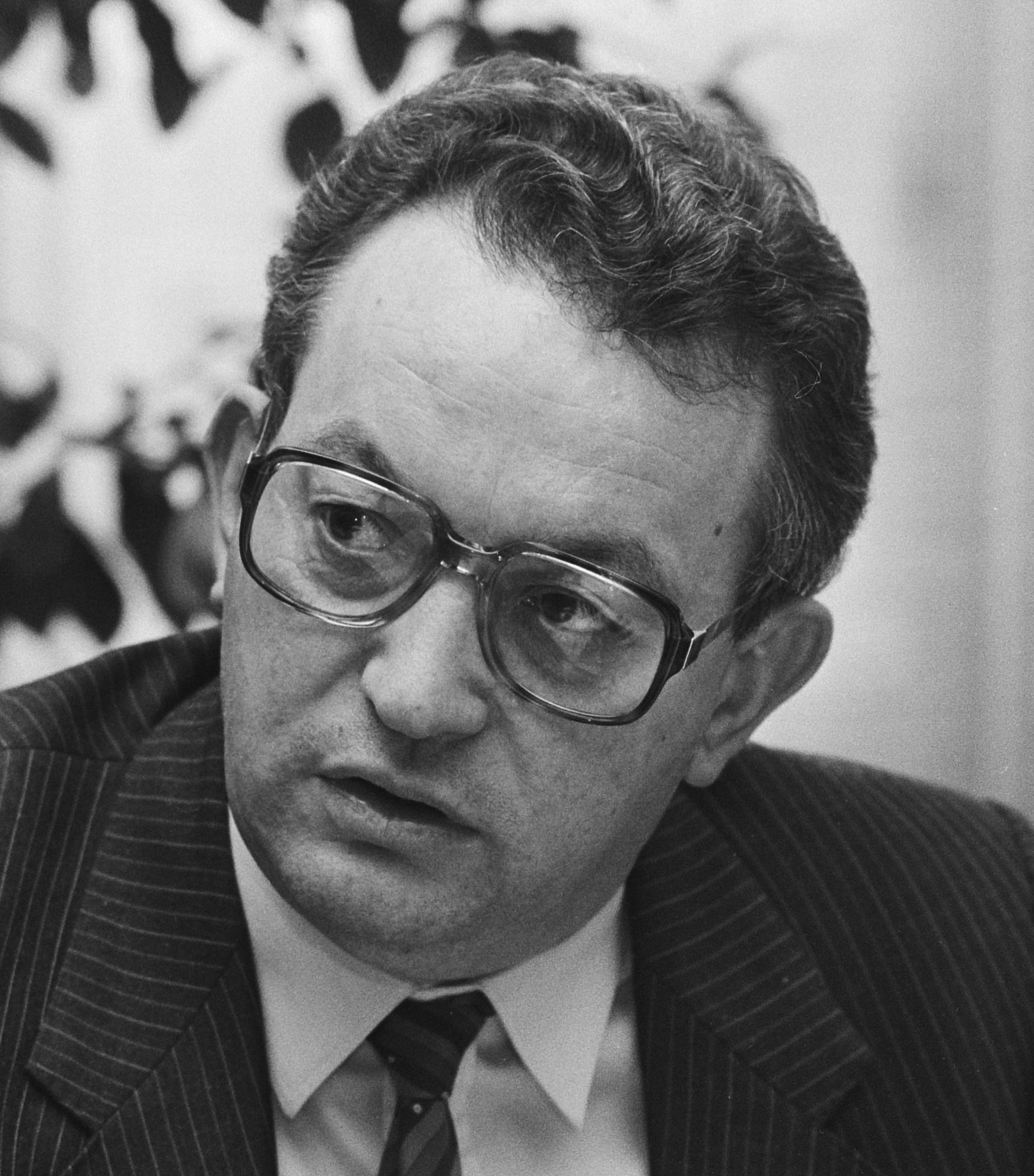
Gerrit Braks, 1984

- Gerrit Braks (1933–2017) a politician and agronomist
- Cas Wouters (1943–2025) a sociologist who embraced figurational sociology
- Anneke van Giersbergen (born 1973) a singer, songwriter, guitarist and pianist; formerly of The Gathering

=== Sport ===
- Ronald Jansen (born 1963) a former field hockey goalkeeper, gold medallist in the 1996 and 2000 Summer Olympics
- Kees Akerboom Jr. (born 1983) a retired basketball player
- Tom van Weert (born 1990) a retired footballer who played for clubs in the Netherlands, Denmark and Greece
