= Ronald Jansen =

Dutch field hockey player

Personal information
- Full name: Franciscus Ronaldus Maria Jansen
- Born: 30 December 1963 (age 62) Sint-Michielsgestel, Netherlands

Sport
- Sport: Field hockey
- Position: Goalkeeper
Senior career
Years	Team	Caps	Goals
–	De Dommel	-	-
–	Wageningen	-	-
–	Oranje Zwart	-	-
–	Den Bosch	-	-
National team
Years	Team	Caps	Goals
1988–2000	Netherlands	182	(0)
Medal record
Men's field hockey
Representing the Netherlands
Olympic Games
Gold medal – first place	1996 Atlanta	Team
Gold medal – first place	2000 Sydney	Team
Bronze medal – third place	1988 Seoul	Team
World Cup
Gold medal – first place	1998 Utrecht	Team
Silver medal – second place	1994 Sydney	Team
Champions Trophy
Gold medal – first place	1996 Madras	Team
Gold medal – first place	1998 Lahore	Team
Gold medal – first place	2000 Amstelveen	Team
Bronze medal – third place	1994 Lahore	Team

Franciscus Ronaldus ("Ronald") Maria Jansen (born 30 December 1963 in Sint-Michielsgestel) is a former field hockey goalkeeper from the Netherlands, who twice won the gold medal at the Summer Olympics.

He played a total number of 183 international matches for his native country, and made his debut on 23 June 1987 at the 1987 Men's Hockey Champions Trophy in a match against Argentina.
