= Cas Wouters =

Dutch sociologist (1943-2025)

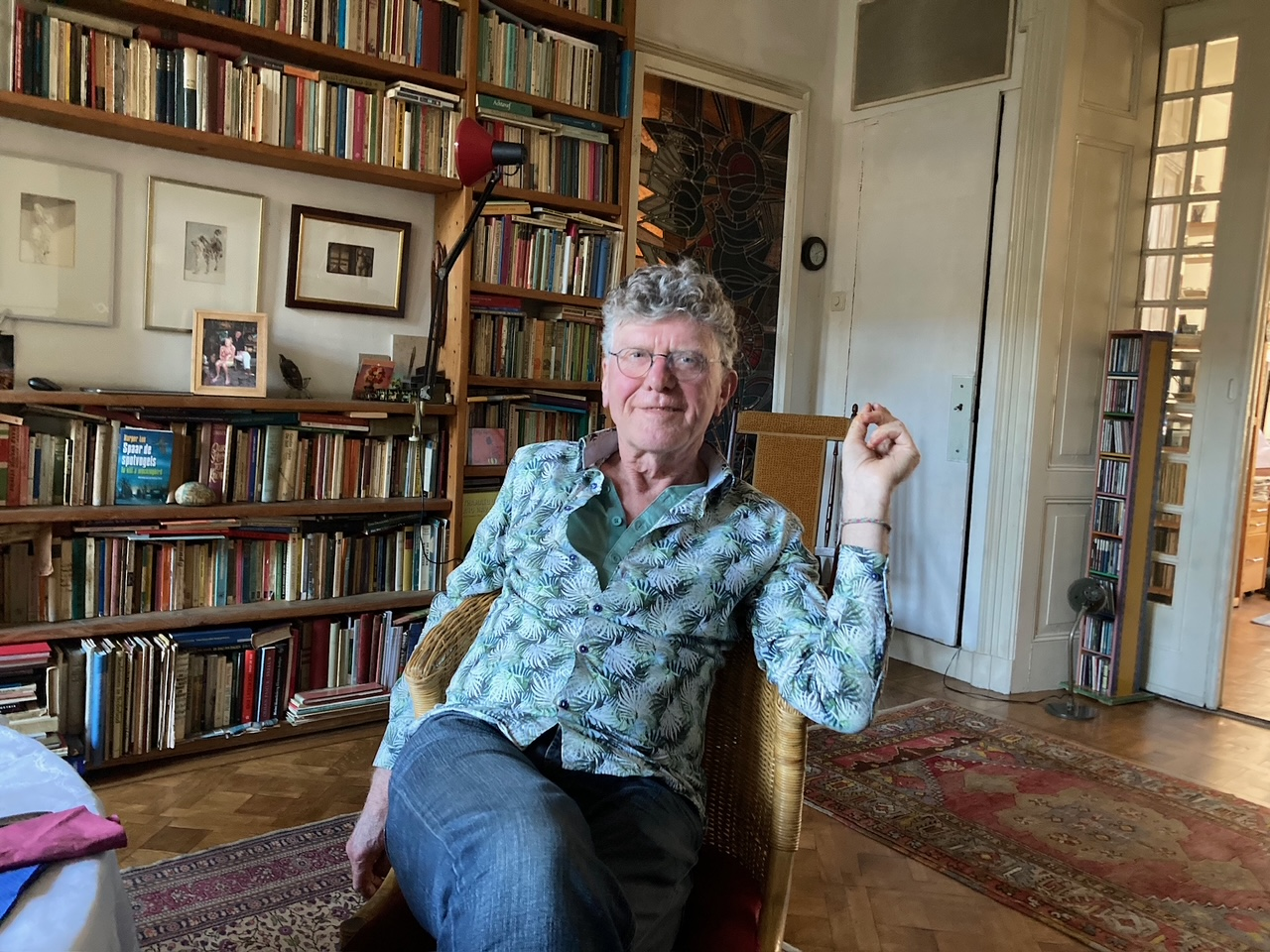
Cas Wouters

Casparus Adrianus Petrus Maria "Cas" Wouters (Sint-Michielsgestel, 1943 – 5 September 2025) was a Dutch sociologist. He studied sociology in Amsterdam and worked as a researcher at Utrecht University, affiliated with the Amsterdam School for Social Science Research.

== Academic background ==
In the 1960s, Wouters studied sociology at the University of Amsterdam with Professor Joop Goudsblom. Wouters wrote his dissertation Informalization about the obvious changes of the western customs and manners in the 20th century. He described the changing behavior of different generations, and summarizes this in his theory of informalization. The question about how these changes in manners and regulations of emotions can be interpreted and explained was the same that Norbert Elias addressed in his most important work, The Civilizing Process (Über den Prozess der Zivilisation), regarding the changes between the 15th and 19th century. Wouters used Elias' theory as a framework while critically observing and analyzing it. His dissertation was published in 1990 as Van minnen en sterven. It was translated into German as Informalisierung.

Wouters was strongly influenced by and contributed to the sociological domain of process or figurational sociology, the discipline which Nobert Elias developed and his followers refined. Wouters used The Civilizing Process to explain changes of social behaviour in the twentieth century, the so-called "age of informalisation". Like Elias, he used books about etiquette to explain social changes, but also other primary sources.

Wouters was a regular contributor to Amsterdams Sociologisch Tijdschrift and the Norbert Elias Foundation.

Wouters' theory of informalisation implies that a long-term process of formalisation – of formalising manners and disciplining people – had been dominant from the sixteenth up to the last quarter of the nineteenth century, after which a process of informalisation has prevailed: behavioural and emotional alternatives increased, together with demands on emotion management or self-control. Wouters elaborated this theoretical perspective in a variety of studies of the late-nineteenth and twentieth-century social and psychic processes, focusing mainly on emotion regulation, dying and mourning, sexuality, and the emancipation of women and children.

In 2004, Wouters published Sex and Manners, Female Emancipation in the West 1890-2000. His systematic and empirical approach was an important contribution to this field of study.

In 2019, with Michael Dunnin, Wouters edited the book Civilisation and Informalisation: Connecting Long-Term Social and Psychic Processes. This reader includes two parts: "Civilisation and Informalisation - the book" (with six chapters written by Cas Wouters), and "Civilisation and Informalisation" (with six chapters written by Jonathan Fletcher, Michael Dunning, Raúl Sánchez García, Arjan Post, Wilbert van Vree, and Richard Kilminster).

Wouters wrote articles in English, Dutch, Spanish and German, on changes in relationships between men and women, the dying and those who live on, and on related, more general social and psychic processes.

Wouters died by euthanasia on 5 September 2025, at the age of 81.

== Selected bibliography ==
=== Books ===
- 1983 (with Bram van Stolk; 2nd ed. 1985): Vrouwen in tweestrijd - Tussen thuis en tehuis : relatieproblemen in de verzorgingsstaat, opgetekend in een crisiscentrum. Deventer: Van Loghum Slaterus. Translated into German as Frauen im Zwiespalt (Suhrkamp 1987).
- 1990: Van minnen en sterven. Amsterdam: Bert Bakker. It was translated into German as Informalisierung (Westdeutscher Verlag, 1999).
- 2004: Sex and Manners: Female Emancipation in the West 1890–2000. London: Sage. (Published in association with Theory, Culture & Society). It was translated into Dutch as Seks en de seksen (Bert Bakker 2005).
- 2007: Informalization: Manners and Emotions since 1890. London: Sage.
- 2019: Civilisation and Informalisation: Connecting Long-Term Social and Psychic Processes. Palgrave Macmillan, Cham. ISBN 978-3-030-00797-3 ISBN 978-3-030-00798-0 (eBook)

=== Articles ===
- 2009: "The Civilizing of Emotions: Formalization and Informalization". pp. 169–194 in Theorizing Emotions: Sociological Explorations and Applications, edited by D. Hopkins, J. Kleres, H. Flam, and H. Kuzmics. New York & Frankfurt am Main, Germany: Campus Verlag.
- 2004: "Changing regimes of manners and emotions: from disciplining to informalizing". pp. 193–211 in The Sociology of Norbert Elias, ISBN 0511189516 edited by Steven Loyal and Stephen Quilley. Cambridge University Press.
- 2002: "Giving the finger". Pp. 369–374 in [Theoretical Criminology, 6 (3)]. London: SAGE Publications.
- 2002: "The Quest for New Rituals in Dying and Mourning: Changes in the We–I Balance". pp. 1–27 in Body & Society, 8 (1). London: SAGE Publications.
- 2002: "What is Love?" on "What is Love? Richard Carlile's Philosophy of Sex" by M.L. Bush. pp. 77–86 in Body & Society, 7 (4). London: SAGE Publications.
- 2001: "The Integration of Classes and Sexes in the Twentieth Century: Etiquette Books and Emotion Management". pp. 50–83 in Norbert Elias and Human Interdependencies, edited by Thomas Salumets. Montreal and Kingston: McGill-Queen's.
- 1999: "Changing Patterns of Social Controls and Self-Controls: On the Rise of Crime since the 1950s and the Sociogenesis of a "Third Nature"". Pp. 416-432 in British Journal of Criminology, 39 (3). Oxford University Press.
- 1999: "Balancing Sex and Love since the 1960s Sexual Revolution". pp. 187–214 in Love & Eroticism, edited by Mike Featherstone. London: SAGE Publications.
- 1998: "How Strange to Ourselves Are Our Feelings of Superiority and Inferiority". pp. 131–150 in Theory, Culture & Society, 15 (1). London: SAGE Publications.
- 1997: "Changes in the "lust balance" of love and sex since the sexual revolution: the example of the Netherlands". pp. 228–249 in Emotions in Social Life: Critical Themes and Contemporary Issues, edited by Gillian Bendelow and Simon J. Williams. London: Routledge.
- 1995 (with Richard Kilminster): "From Philosophy to Sociology: Elias and the Neo-Kantians" pp. 81–120 in Theory, Culture & Society, 12 (3). London: SAGE Publications.
- 1991: "On Status Competition and Emotion Management: The Study of Emotions as a New Field". pp. 699–717 in Journal of Social History, 24 (4). Pittsburgh, Carnegie Mellon University.
- 1989: "The Sociology of Emotions and Flight Attendants: Hoschild's Managed Heart". pp. 95–123 in Theory, Culture & Society, 6 (1). London: SAGE Publications.
- 1987: "Developments in Behavioural Codes Between the Sexes; Formalization of Informalization, The Netherlands 1930-1985". pp. 405–429 in Theory, Culture & Society, 4 (2/3). London: SAGE Publications.
- 1986: "Formalization and Informalization: Changing Tension Balances in Civilizing Processes". pp. 1–19 in Theory, Culture & Society, 3 (2). London: SAGE Publications.
- 1977: "Informalisation and the Civilising Process". pp. 437–456 in Human Figurations, essays for/Aufsätze für Norbert Elias, edited by P.R. Gleichmann, J. Goudsblom and H. Korte. Stichting Amsterdams Sociologisch Tijdschrift

A complete list of publications is to be found on the website of Cas Wouters, including links to his digital version of his books.
