= Brabants Landschap =

Landscape in the Netherlands

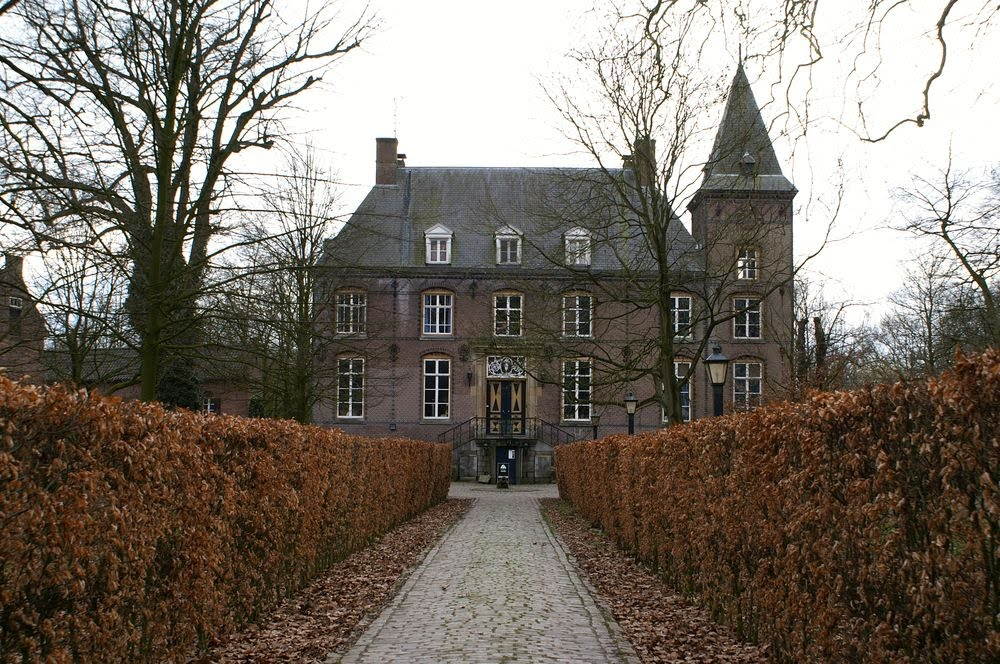
- Nemerlaer Castle, office of Brabants Landschap
- Formation: 1932
- Legal status: Foundation
- Purpose: Protect and maintain nature in North-Brabant
- Headquarters: Haaren
- Location: Netherlands
- Region served: North-Brabant, Netherlands
- Staff: 60
- Website: www.brabantslandschap.nl

Brabants Landschap, officially Stichting het Noordbrabants Landschap, is one of 12 provincial landscape foundations in the Netherlands.

== History ==
=== Foundation ===
Heath at Neterselse Heide

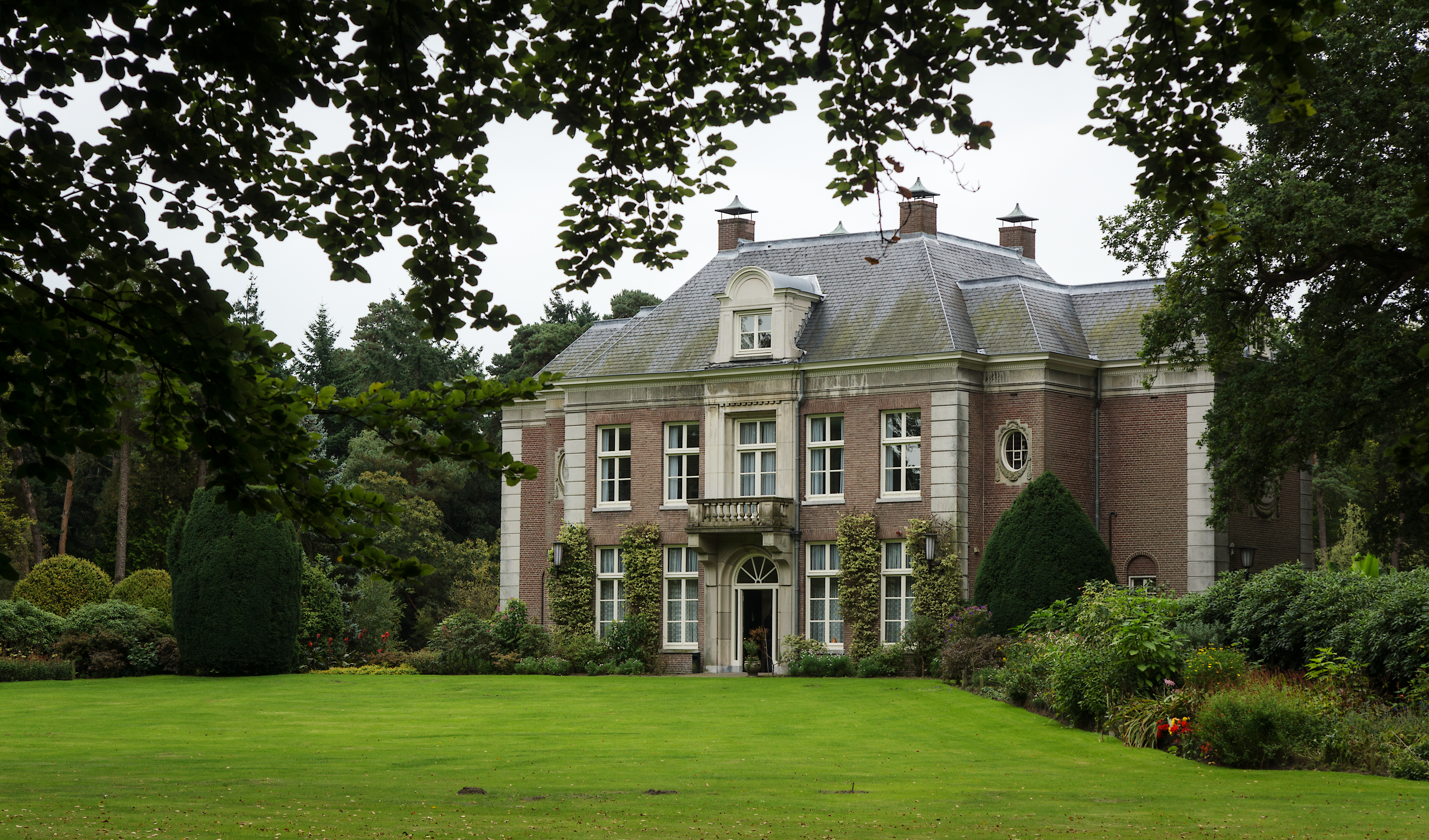
De Oude Hondsberg

Modern nature conservation in North Brabant province started with the acquisition of the Oisterwijk forests and fens by the society Vereniging Natuurmonumenten in 1913. Natuurmonumenten thoughts its nature conservation efforts could be more effectively handled at the provincial level, while North Brabant was concerned with its drive to turn the last rough terrains into agricultural land.

In June 1931, the provincial executive of North Brabant sent a proposal to the provincial council to create a foundation called 'Het Noordbrabantsch Landschap' with the help of Natuurmonumenten. Modeled after the Utrechts Landschap (1927) and Geldersch Landschap (1929), the foundation sought to promote nature and a sightseeing landscape by acquiring and maintaining terrains.

On December 11th, 1931, 'Het Noord-brabantsch Landschap' was constituted in 's-Hertogenbosch, with the Queen's commissioner as president of the foundation and staffed by at least 28 other board members, who represented all parts of the province. The board selection included members who had earlier shown interest in nature conservation.

=== Early years ===
In the early years, the Brabants Landschap had not garnered much support and could do little more than consulting or planning, with only limited means of acquiring terrains. Despite this, the foundation did organize activities like guided tours and exhibitions. An important function of the foundation was that its members, supporters, and comparable organizations had free access to many protected areas. The foundation's advisory work has led to some success. During the 2,500 hectare commercial cultivation project that led to Landgoed de Utrecht, the area now known as the Mispeleindse Heide was spared due to the foundation's efforts. The appointment of Constant Kortmann as King's commissioner in 1959 resulted in the province instituting a subsidy of 50% for acquisitions like those made by Brabants Landschap.

=== The first terrains are bought ===
In 1961, Noord Brabants Landschap started its grounds acquisition with the purchase of 4.5 hectares in Baarschot which included a mere known locally as 'Krantven'. The second terrain, known as 'Het Zand', was 1.5 hectares and bordered the Oranjebond terrains south of Hilvarenbeek. Seeking to increase national tourism, the Dutch government focused efforts on several terrains, including North Brabant, which aided the foundation's operations.

In June 1963, Brabants Landschap bought its first large terrain, the estate 'Ter Braakloop' measuring 50 hectares, which in turn forced the foundation to increase fundraising efforts. In November 1963, the adjacent estate 'De Oude Hondsberg' followed, and a 140 hectares estate was formed near Oisterwijk. Shortly afterward, the Nemerlaer Castle and its estate were also acquired.

=== An influential organization ===
In the mid-1960s, the Brabants Landschap became an influential foundation through acquiring more land and supporters. In 1972, Brabants Landschap owned 2,400 hectares and started taking a sharper stance on general environmental issues, such as pollution; that same year, the foundation had 3,627 supporters. In 1978, it published a book about its 4,000 hectares of terrain.

In August 1987, Brabants Landschap owned nearly 10,000 hectares. However, upon leaving the province, the Queen's commissioner Dries van Agt said the province spent more money on roads than any other province. Meanwhile, North Brabant failed to protect its landscapes partly due to the province's agricultural interests.

=== The agrarian landscape ===
The landscape of North Brabant is a predominantly agricultural landscape with hedges, grassland, and sparse trees home to many common species. While Brabants Landschap focuses on the whole landscape, its restriction to only acquiring land meant it was limited to protecting wild areas such as forests, heath, and water. Since the main provincial nature is found in the agricultural areas, it was also where most of the landscape degradation took place. One of the primary causes was land consolidation, with provisions such as the Land Consolidation Law of 1954 allowing farmland parcels to become larger and more optimized for mechanization. It was not until 1975 that environmental organizations became formally involved in this process. In 1985, the land consolidation law was replaced by the Landrinrichtingswet. Nevertheless, even with formal conservation representation, the environment continued to degrade in locations such as North Brabant, where the agricultural interests were more powerful.

=== Acid Rain ===
Other challenges for North Brabant were acid rain and the manure crisis. The acid rain damage was heavy in the Peel, east of Eindhoven, as it was near West-German and Belgian heavy industry sites. However, by far the biggest cause was intensive pig farming, which relied heavily on importing food via the port of Rotterdam. Since starting a pig farm only required a backyard large enough to build a stable, with a high degree of automation and a low degree of care, many locals became pig farmers. While some pig farmers gained much wealth in a short period, by 1988 there were around 3 million pigs in the Peel resulting in large quantities of manure. Despite the many rules to limit manure deposition on the land, farmers often evaded them. Ammonia from the manure reacted in the air with sulfur dioxide from industrial pollution, causing acid precipitation.

In 1983, local forest managers noted trees becoming unusually vulnerable to fungus epidemics and no longer recovered from caterpillar plagues. Brabants Landschap noted that local forests were dying and their heath turned yellow instead of purple, and contacted local municipalities to address the problem. While some were willing to limit pig farming, other municipalities chose to ignore taking measures, including national legislation which aimed to keep pig farms away from forests. One of the primary obstacles was that many farmers were also members of a municipal council, and thus allowed the agricultural sector to annul national and provincial agricultural policies at the local level.

=== Flood prevention ===
In the 1990s, drought became another crisis in North Brabant despite the province's historically large annual precipitation surplus. These droughts were likely caused by human interference, such as through land consolidation, canalization of rivers and brooks, and increased water consumption. The droughts led to heavy winter precipitation discharging into the sea almost immediately. This was an advantage for farmers, who could work the dry land with heavy machines during early spring and promoted earlier growth of plants throughout spring. The disadvantage was that, in the summer, the province and its farmers used massive amounts of groundwater. Brabants Landschap noted that, as a result, trees with shallow roots were killed because their roots no longer reached the groundwater. In 1992, the province severely limited agricultural use of groundwater in order to safeguard the future supply of drinking water.

The January 1995 high water on the Dutch Rhine, Meuse, and IJssel led to the evacuation of 250,000 people. In the aftermath, the Dutch government focused its efforts on the temporary water capacity of rural areas, which had to be restored to prevent future disasters in the Dutch delta. Recognizing the local nature of this issue, the national government provided funding but directed local organizations to address it, including Brabants Landschap. While not as crucial as the water boards, but Brabants Landschap continues to play a local role.

=== Nature Network ===
In 1990, the Dutch government coined the term Ecologische Hoofdstructuur (EHS), now Natuurnetwerk Nederland (NNN) (Nature Network Netherlands). The idea was to collectively consider nature reserves and surrounding areas in conservation efforts. These areas would be connected with wildlife corridors so that species could migrate between terrains instead of becoming extinct via isolation.

In 2013, the execution of Natuurnetwerk Nederland was delegated to the provinces. The local Natuurnetwerk Brabant aims to have 129,000 hectares of nature (a quarter of the province) and about 1,500 km of wildlife corridors by 2027. In practice, the execution of Natuurnetwerk Brabant is often integrated with the plans for flood prevention.

== Brabants Landschap today ==
=== The organization ===
Brabants Landschap has an Algemeen Bestuur (general executive board) of 40 people who broadly represent the Brabant Society, but also contains local people interested in nature conservation. The Algemeen Bestuur functions similarly to a shareholder meeting, appointing the supervisory board and approving the annual report, the budget, and general policy.

The Hoofdbestuur is like a supervisory board which approves all real estate transactions and appoints chief executive officers, such as Joris Hogenboom as of April 15th, 2021. In 2020, there were 69 employees, with 25 part-time workers, 23 office workers in Haaren, while the rest work outdoors.

The Coördinatiepunt Landschapsbeheer (landscape coordination agency) is a distinct part of Brabants Landschap. The agency currently has 11 employees and coordinates policies and subsidies in the parts of the province outside the Natuurnetwerk Brabant, which are mainly agrarian. As such, it executes provincial policies based on a contract with the province and also supports volunteer activities in nature.

On a national level, Brabants Landschap cooperates with many organizations, with the 11 other Provincial Landscapes it cooperates in LandschappenNL.

=== Communication and information ===
To gather support for its mission, Brabants Landschap focuses on informing and educating people about the province's nature. Brabants Landschap organizes guided tours for its members, publishes a magazine and online walking routes, and constructs on-site information panels.

=== The future ===
In 2021, Brabants Landschap highlighted two important policy themes: the climate crisis and the nitrogen crisis. The latter is a Dutch-specific crisis, which broke out on May 29th, 2019 when a verdict of the Council of State blocked around 18,000 building and infrastructure projects. The cause was the government's insufficient handling in nitrogen compound deposition in Natura 2000 areas, about two-thirds of which were generated by agriculture. The |Werkgroep Behoud de Peel, which had been fighting acid rain in De Peel since 1978, was one of the two litigating parties supported by the Council of State's verdict.

The Brabants Landschap seeks to address the climate crisis by focusing on local drought and flooding caused by extreme weather. Combined with the nitrogen crisis, the national government made funding available to address both crises. To do so, Brabants Landschap seeks to buy the farmlands used near Natura 2000 areas.

== Areas owned by Brabants Landschap ==
In 2020, Brabants Landschap owned about 110 terrains, totaling 18,762 hectares.
