= List of Dutch noble families =

Dutch nobility is regulated by act of law in the Wet op de adeldom (Law Regarding Nobility, passed into law on May 10, 1994) and is overseen by the Hoge Raad van Adel (High Council of Nobility), an official state institution of the Kingdom of the Netherlands.

Before 1814, the history of nobility was separate for each of the Dutch provinces. In the Early Middle Ages, there were, in each province, a number of feudal lords who often were just as powerful, and sometimes more so, than the rulers themselves. In old times, no title other than knight existed.

In the middle of the fourteenth century, quarrels between the feudal lords reduced many families and castles to ruins, contributing to the Dukes of Burgundys' acquisition by conquest or inheritance of many of the provinces forming the Kingdom of the Netherlands.

In 1581, representatives of the Seven Provinces abjured Philip II of Spain, heir of the Dukes of Burgundy. This left a great part of the executive and legislative power to the Ridderschap (knightly estate) of each province, which consisted of the representatives of those families of the old feudal nobility.

In 1795, the Batavian Revolution did away with their power, and it was not before 1813, when William I became King of the Netherlands, that they were again given power in another form. Still, by the time of the constitution of 1848, they had no influence in government affairs.

In 1813, if no higher title was recognised, the men only were to bear the hereditary predicate of Jonkheer. Some old feudal families obtained or assumed the title of Baron or Baroness for all their descendants.

Older nobility, having been granted their titles by either the Holy Roman Emperors or French Kings long before 1813, held their pre-existent titles, some of which were confirmed in the new Kingdom of the Netherlands (such as the families Bentinck, Limburg Stirum and Van Rechteren). In some of these families it is more usual that only the oldest male descendant bears the family title while other descendants bear the predicate of Jonkheer (m) or Jonkvrouw (f).

== Princes/Princesses ==
- Van Oranje-Nassau; members of the royal house are Prince of the Netherlands and/or Prince of Orange-Nassau
- De Bourbon de Parme; some members of the royal family (descendants of Princess Irene of the Netherlands) are Prince of Bourbon de Parme
- De Riquet de Caraman; the head of the family is the Prince of Chimay
- Wellesley; the Duke of Wellington in the peerage of the United Kingdom also holds the Dutch & Belgian title Prince of Waterloo

== Dukes/Duchesses ==
The title Duke/Duchess (Hertog in Dutch) is no longer in existence in noble families of the Kingdom of the Netherlands in this day and age.

== Marquises/Marquesses ==
- Le Poer Trench; the Earl of Clancarty in the peerage of Ireland is the Marquis of Heusden,
- D'Auxy
- Van Hoensbroeck (this family left the Netherlands in the 19th century. Known in Germany as Graf von und zu Hoensbroech, the head of this family bears the titles of Marquis and Count von und zu Hoensbroech)

== Counts/Countesses ==
- Bijl
- D'Auxy
- Bentinck-Aldenburg
- Van den Bosch
- Van den Bergh
- Van Bylandt
- Dumonceau
- Van der Duyn
- Van Bruggen
- Festetics de Tolna
- De Ficquelmont / De Ficquelmont de Vijle
- De Geloes
- Van der Goltz
- Van Heerdt
- Van Heiden
- De Hochepied
- Van Hoensbroeck
- Van Hogendorp
- Van Limburg Stirum
- Van Lynden
- De Marchant et d'Ansembourg
- Van Mijnsheerenland; The title (Dutch: Graaf) belongs to the family of the Marquise van Eeden, and is bestowed upon the eldest male heir. They also bear the titles of Viscount (Burggraaf) van Binnenmaas and in Belgium Baron van Moerkerken-Damme.
- De Norman et d'Audenhove
- Von Oberndorff
- Van Oijen
- Van Oranje-Nassau van Amsberg; members of this family are Count of Oranje-Nassau as well Jonkheer van Amsberg
- De Perponcher Sedlnitsky
- Von Quadt
- Van Randwijck
- Von Ranzow
- Van Rechteren / Van Rechteren Limpurg
- van Renesse (extinct since 1855)
- De Riquet de Caraman
- Schimmelpenninck
- Zu Stolberg-Stolberg
- Van Wassenaer
- Wolff Metternich
- Van Zuylen van Nijevelt
- De Spangen

== Viscounts/Viscountesses ==
- Van Binnenmaas; The title (Dutch: Burggraaf) belongs to the family of the Marquess van Eeden, and is bestowed upon the eldest male heir. They also bear the titles of Count (Dutch: Graaf) van Mijnsheerenland and in Belgium Baron van Moerkerken-Damme.
- De Preud'homme d'Hailly de Nieuport (Viscount of Nieuport)
- Du Bus
- Roest van Alkemade

== Barons/Baronesses ==
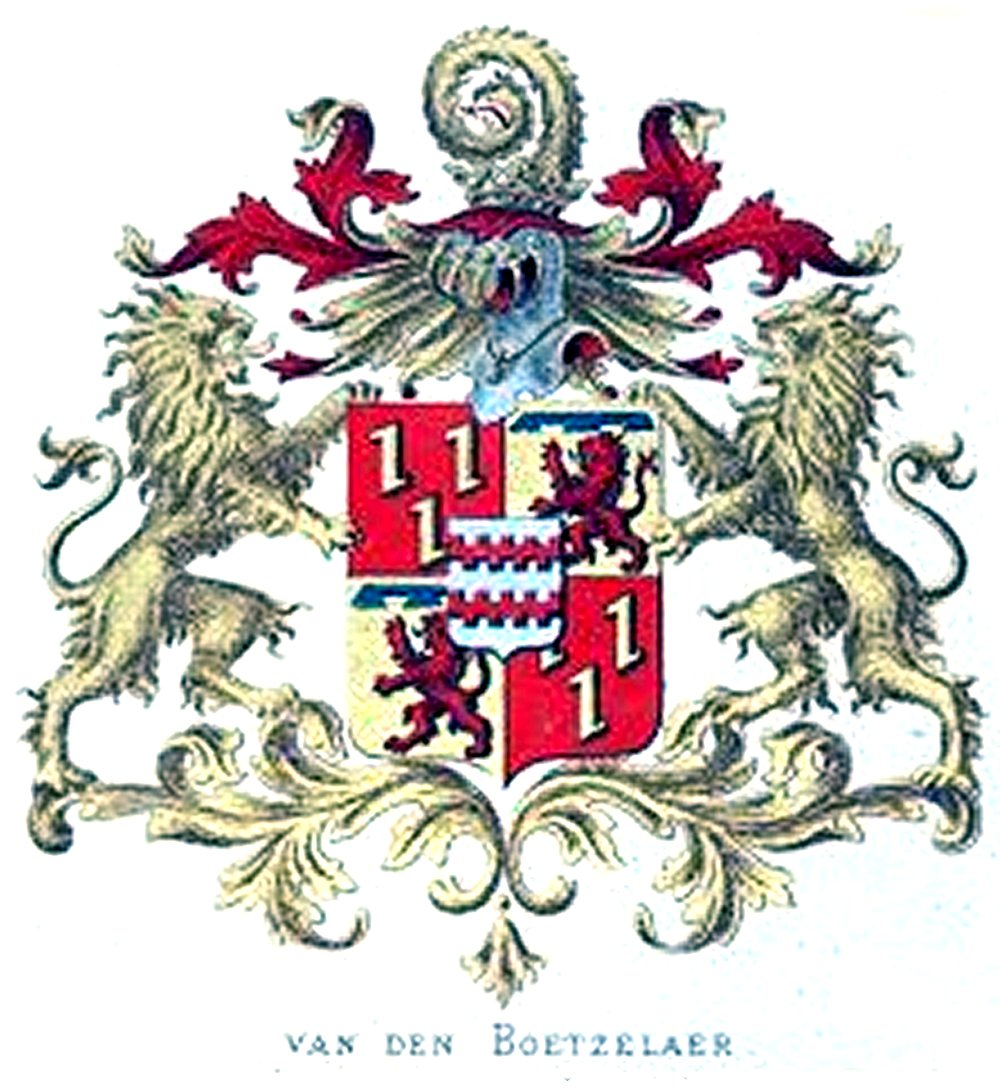
Coat of arms van den Boetzelaer

Coat of arms Taets van Amerongen

- d'Ablaing van Giessenburg (extinct in the Netherlands)(Now prominent in the US)
- Van Aerssen Beijeren van Voshol
- Van Asbeck
- d'Aulnis de Bourouill
- Bijl
- Baud
- Bentinck
- van Blommestein
- Van Boetzelaer
- Van der Borch van Verwolde
- Van der Borch tot Verwolde
- Van der Borch tot Verwolde van Vorden
- Van der Borch genaamd van Rouwenoort
- Brantsen
- Bijl
- Van Dalen
- Van Breugel
- Calkoen
- Van der Capellen
- Van Coeverden
- Collot d'Escury
- Constant de Rebecque
- Creutz
- Van Dedem
- Driehuis
- Dibbets
- Van Doorn
- Van Dorth tot Medler
- Du Bus (extinct since 1976)
- Van Eck
- Van der Feltz
- Van Geen
- De Geer
- Gericke
- Gevers
- De Girard de Mielet van Coehoorn
- Groeninx van Zoelen
- Van Haersolte
- Van Haersolte van Haerst
- Van Hangest d'Yvoy
- Van Hardenbroek
- Van Harinxma thoe Slooten
- Van Heeckeren
- Van Heemstra
- Van Heerdt
- Van Hemert tot Dingshof
- De Heusch
- De Raad
- Van der Heyden
- Van der Heyden van Doornenburg
- Van der Tuuk
- Van Hogendorp
- Van Hövell / Van Hövell tot Westerflier / Van Hövell van Wezeveld en Westerflier
- Huyssen van Kattendijke
- Van Imhoff
- Van Isselmuden
- Van Ittersum
- De Keverberg (extinct since 1928)
- Van Knobelsdorff
- De Kock
- Krayenhoff
- Lampsins
- Van Lamsweerde
- Van Lawick
- Van Loo
- Van Pabst
- Lewe van Aduard
- De Loë
- Van Lynden
- Mackay of Ophemert and Zennewijnen (see Lord Reay, Baronet of Strathnaver, and Chief of Clan Mackay)
- Melvill van Carnbee
- Michiels
- Mollerus
- Van Nagell
- Nahuys
- Van Oldeneel tot Oldenzeel
- D'Olne (extinct since ca. 1890)
- Van Pallandt
- Prisse
- Rasmijn
- Van Raders
- Van Reede
- Rengers, van Welderen
- Van Rijckevorsel
- Röell
- Sandberg
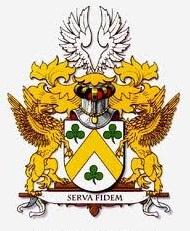
  Sandberg noble family coat of arms
- Schimmelpenninck van der Oije
- Thoe Schwartzenberg en Hohenlansberg
- Sirtema van Grovestins
- Six
- Van Slingelandt
- Sloet / Sloet van Oldruitenborgh / Sloet tot Everlo / Sloet tot Lindenhorst
- De Smeth
- Snouckaert van Schauburg
- Speyart van Woerden
- Steengracht
- Van Strating / Straten / Straaten
- Stratenus
- Sweerts de Landas
- Van Sytzama
- Taets van Amerongen / Taets van Amerongen van Renswoude
- Van Till
- Van Tuyll van Serooskerken
- Van Verschuer
- Van Voorst tot Voorst
- De Vos van Steenwijk
- Van Vredenburch
- Van Wassenaer / Van Wassenaer van Catwijck
- Van Watervliet (extinct in The Netherlands, extant in North America)
- De Weichs de Wenne
- De Wijkerslooth de Weerdesteijn
- Van Wijnbergen
- Wittert
- Van Zuylen van Nijevelt

== Hereditary knights/Jonkvrouwen ==
- Bijl
- De Behr (extinct 1954)
- De Bye (also: Van der Does de Bye)
- Van Citters
- Von Devivere
- Du Bus (extinct 1976)
- Van der Heim (extinct 1898)
- Huyssen van Kattendijke
- Van Lockhorst (extinct 1921)
- De Maurissens
- Pauw
- De Plevits
- Van Rappard
- Van der Renne (extinct 1964)
- Van Rosenthal
- De van der Schueren
- De Stuers
- De Thier
- Van Westreenen van Tiellandt (extinct 1848)

== Jonkheren/Jonkvrouwen ==
Jonkheer/Jonkvrouw

- Alberda van Ekenstein
- Van Oranje-Nassau van Amsberg; members of this family are Count of Oranje-Nassau as well Jonkheer van Amsberg
- Van Andringa de Kempenaer
- Van Asch van Wijck
- Van Baerdt van Sminia
- Von Balluseck
- Barnaart
- Barnaart van Bergen
- Bijl
- De Beaufort
- Beelaerts van Blokland
- Van Beijma
- Van Beijma thoe Kingma
- Van Benthem van den Bergh / Van den Berch van Heemstede
- Van Beresteyn
- Van den Bergh
- Backer
- De Beaufort / Godin de Beaufort
- Den Beer Poortugael
- Bicker
- Bloys van Treslong
- Boddaert
- Boogaert / Van Adrichem Boogaert
- Boreel
- Van den Bosch
- Bosch van Drakestein
- De Bosch Kemper
- Von Bose
- Bowier
- nl:Van den Brandeler
- De Brauw
- Von Chrismar
- Calkoen
- Changuion
- Van Citters
- Dedel
- Van der Does
- Van der Does de Willebois
- Van Doorn
- Elias
- Van den Eynde
- Van Eys
- Van Eysinga
- Feith
- Flugi van Aspermont
- Van Foreest
- Van Geen
- De Geer / Van Lintelo de Geer
- Von Geusau / Alting van Geusau / Valckenier von Geusau
- Gevaerts
- Gevers / Gevers Deynoot / Gevers van Endegeest / Gevers Leuven
- Von Ghycze
- De Girard de Mielet van Coehoorn
- Van der Goes / Van der Goes van Naters
- Goldman
- Graafland / Hooft Graafland / Hooft Graafland van Schotervlieland
- De Graeff
- Graswinckel
- Greven
- Le Grelle
- Groeninx van Zoelen
- Van Grotenhuis van Onstein
- Gülcher (noble branch extinct)
- Van Haeften
- Van Haersma de With
- Van Heemskerck van Beest
- Hesselt van Dinter
- Van Heurn
- Van der Hoeven
- Van Holthe / Van Holthe tot Echten
- Hooft
- Hooft van Woudenberg
- Van Humalda van Eysinga
- Huydecoper / Huydecoper van Nigtevecht
- Van Iddekinge
- Jankovich de Jeszenice
- De Jong van Beek en Donk
- De Jonge / De Jonge van Campens Nieuwland / De Jonge van Ellemeet / De Jonge van Zwijnsbergen
- Just de la Paisières
- Van Karnebeek
- van der Kelen
- Kenessey de Kenese
- Van Kinschot
- De Kock
- Kreutzwendedich von dem Borne
- De Kuyper
- De la Court
- De Lange
- Van Lawick
- Van Lawick van Pabst
- Leijssius
- Van Lennep
- Van Lidth de Jeude
- Van Loon
- Loudon
- Lycklama à Nijeholt
- Van der Maessen de Sombreff
- De Marees van Swinderen
- Martens van Sevenhoven
- Martini Buys
- Van der Meer de Walcheren
- Merkes van Gendt
- Meyer
- Michiels
- Van der Mieden / Van der Mieden van Opmeer
- Mock
- Mollerus
- Von Mühlen
- De Muralt
- Nahuys
- Van Nispen tot Pannerden /Van Nispen tot Sevenaer
- van Oordt
- Op ten Noort
- Van Panhuys
- De Pesters
- Ploos van Amstel
- Van de Poll
- Plompe van Meerdervoort
- Prins
- Prisse
- Quarles de Quarles / Quarles van Ufford
- Quintus
- Van Raab van Canstein
- De Ranitz
- Reigersman
- Rengers Hora Siccama
- Repelaer / Repelaer van Driel
- Rethaan Macaré
- Reuchlin
- Van Riemsdijk
- Van Rijckevorsel
- Röell
- De Rotte
- De Roy van Zuidewijn
- Rutgers van Rozenburg
- Sandberg / Sandberg van Boelens / Sandberg tot Essenburg
- Van Santen
- Van Staden
- Van Sasse van Ysselt
- De Savornin Lohman
- Schimmelpenninck
- Von Schmidt auf Altenstadt
- Schorer
- De Serière
- Serraris
- Sickinghe
- Six
- Van Sminia
- Smissaert
- Smits van Oyen
- Snoeck
- Snouck Hurgronje
- Speelman
- Spengler
- Van Spengler
- Stoop
- Storm van 's-Gravesande
- Stratenus
- Strick van Linschoten
- Van Suchtelen / Van Suchtelen van de Haare
- Teding van Berkhout
- Testa
- Van Tets
- Tjarda van Starkenborgh Stachouwer
- Des Tombe
- Trip / Laman Trip / Van Vierssen Trip
- Tulleken
- Vegelin van Claerbergen
- Verheyen
- Versélewel de Witt Hamer
- De Villeneuve
- Van Vliet
- Van Vredenburch
- Van Weede / Van Weede van Dijkveld
- Van Weme
- Wesselman van Helmond
- Wichers / Van Buttingha Wichers
- De Wijkerslooth de Weerdesteijn
- Wittert van Hoogland
- Wladimiroff
- Van der Wyck

== See also ==
- Regenten
- List of Dutch patrician families

== Sources ==
- Melville de Massue, Marquis de Ruvigny, The Nobilities of Europe, Adamant Media Corporation, 2000
