= Mona Louise Parsons =

Canadian actress

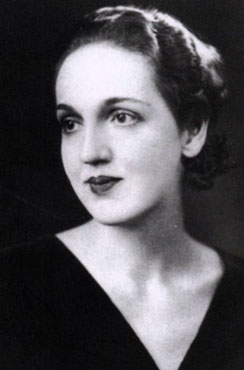
- Parsons photographed in a promotional photo, circa 1929
- Born: 17 February 1901; Middleton, Nova Scotia, Canada
- Died: 28 November 1976 (aged 75); Wolfville, Nova Scotia, Canada
- Website: https://www.monaparsons.ca/

Mona Louise Parsons (February 17, 1901 – November 28, 1976) was a Canadian actress, nurse, and member of an informal Dutch resistance network in the Netherlands from 1940 to 1941 during the Nazi occupation. She became the only Canadian female civilian to be imprisoned by the Nazis and one of the first and few women to be tried by a Nazi military tribunal in the Netherlands.

She received commendations for her bravery in helping Allied airmen evade capture from both Air Chief Marshal Lord Arthur Tedder of the Royal Air Force on behalf of the British people and from General Dwight Eisenhower, who expressed the gratitude of the American people.

== Early years ==
Parsons was born in Middleton, Nova Scotia. Upon graduating from the Acadia Ladies' Seminary in Wolfville, Nova Scotia with a certificate in elocution, Parsons attended the Currie School of Expression in Boston. She returned to Wolfville to attend Acadia University for a time, where she acted in several productions. After leaving Acadia, Parsons briefly taught elocution at Conway Central College in Conway, Arkansas. She studied acting and moved to New York City in 1929, where she became a Ziegfeld chorus girl in the Ziegfeld Follies revues. She later became a nurse after attending the Jersey School of Medicine from which she graduated cum laude in 1935. She was employed in the Park Avenue offices of an expatriate Nova Scotia otolaryngologist. In February 1937, Parsons' brother introduced her to millionaire Dutch businessman Willem Leonhardt. The couple married in Laren, Netherlands on September 1, 1937.

== Second World War ==
Upon the invasion of the Netherlands by the Germans in May 1940, Parsons joined a network of resistance composed of people from diverse walks of life: farmers, teachers, businesspeople. Like the famous Corrie ten Boom, Parsons sheltered downed Allied airmen in her home, "Ingleside", near Laren. At the beginning of the German occupation, Parsons dismissed her servants so that their quarters on the top floor of Ingleside could be used to accommodate Allied airmen. A hiding place, behind the closet in the master bedroom, was available as a temporary emergency shelter for the airmen if her home was searched by the Nazis. Once the pilots left Parsons' home, they were transported to Leiden, where fishing boats took them to rendezvous with British submarines for their return to England. The number of Allied pilots she saved is unknown. The last airmen to hide at Ingleside remained for an unprecedented six days in September 1941. The network had been infiltrated, and contacts were unable to move the airmen as previously planned. Flight Engineer William 'Jock' Moir and Navigator Richard Pape were finally moved to Leiden, where they were caught by the Gestapo.

Based on information available at the Dutch Institute for War Documentation, Mona Parsons' biographer Andria Hill learned that she was arrested by the Gestapo at her home on September 29, 1941. She was taken first to Amstelveense Prison and then to Weteringschans Prison in Amsterdam (present day Holland Casino). At her trial on December 22, 1941, Parsons was found guilty of treason and sentenced to death by firing squad. She is reported to have responded to her sentence with such dignified calm that the chief judge permitted her to appeal. The sentence was commuted to life with hard labour.

On March 6, 1942, Parsons was taken with several other prisoners for transport to Anrath Prison in Germany. Parsons was transferred to Wiedenbruck, where she worked on an assembly line creating plywood wings for small craft, then on a line assembling igniters for bombs. She became ill with bronchitis several times and, when put in the infirmary, was tasked with knitting socks for German soldiers. On February 6, 1945, the prisoners at Wiedenbruck were herded onto a train bound for another prison in Vechta. Close by were two hospitals, an airfield and a major train junction. Parsons was put to work both in the prison and on occasional details outside to take food from the prison kitchen to wounded soldiers and other patients in the hospitals. She wrote:

The first year I was ill a lot, weighed only about 94 pounds & was green - night sweats, coughing & diarrhoea every day for 3½ months & often vomiting. Tears have run down my cheeks for hunger. When the diarrhoea got better I was given a pint of soup extra - made from turnip & potato peelings - every day for 6 months & my vitamin tablets which I had been allowed to keep with me. There were no medicines to be had. We slept four in a tiny cell built for one. In all the years of imprisonment I slept always on a straw sack on the floor.

I was in solitary once for two weeks, for writing a letter in English. Fortunately no one could read English, otherwise another prisoner might have been involved. I got out of it by saying it was only a little story I was writing to amuse myself. We were not allowed to have pencil or paper. Practically 4 years of isolation. During my first contact with people - after throwing off my half-witted act - I felt only half conscious of all that went on about me. My body was shaky - my brain seemed quite numb - thoroughly incapable of absorbing what was said to me. My head spun. It just seemed too much, all of a sudden. We'd had literally no brain stimulation all these years - we were forbidden to talk during our 12 hour working day - at night too tired to do anything but crawl into bed. Even when we weren't too tired to talk - we'd have little to talk about. We heard no news scarcely. We were not even allowed to have books.

On March 24, 1945, as Allied forces bombed the prison camp, Parsons escaped with young Dutch Baroness Wendelien van Boetzelaer. Walking in frigid temperatures in short-sleeved prison garb, their shoes soon gave out. Although as a young woman Parsons spoke fluent German and knew the country well, she did not risk speaking German with a Canadian accent. Using her acting skills, she posed as the young woman's mentally-challenged auntie who could not speak because of a cleft palate. The pair walked and evaded capture for three weeks, exchanging labour for food and lodging, often in a barn. During that time, they covered approximately 125 km through Germany. The two became separated at Rhede, near the Dutch/German border. Parsons continued her act alone. Eventually, after an Allied artillery bombardment, she was able to cross to Vlagtwedde, the Netherlands. There Parsons told a Dutch farmer that she was Canadian and needed to find British troops. The farmer took her to the North Nova Scotia Highlanders.

== Nova Scotia ==
Parsons and her husband Leonhardt were reunited after the war, but he never fully recovered from his imprisonment and died in 1956. Soon after his death, Parsons learned that he had left one quarter of his estate to his mistress. Shortly after the funeral, Parsons learned that Leonhardt had a biological son. Under Dutch law, he was entitled to three quarters of Leonhardt's multi-million guilder estate. Parsons was left with nothing. Although she launched a legal battle that would span several years and one ocean, she was unsuccessful.

Parsons returned to Nova Scotia in December 1957 with what had been deemed her possessions. There she became reacquainted with a childhood friend, Major General Harry Foster. They married in 1959 and lived in Lobster Point, Chester, Nova Scotia (near the Chester Golf Club). Foster died in 1964; Parsons eventually moved back to Wolfville, Nova Scotia in 1970, where she remained until her death. She is buried in the family plot at the Willowbank Cemetery, Wolfville, Nova Scotia.

In 2005, Historica Canada released a Heritage Minute on Parsons, detailing her arrest, and her eventual escape. In May 2017 a statue in her honour titled The joy is almost too much to bear was unveiled in Wolfville. In November 2023, Parsons was featured on a Canada Post stamp.

== See also ==
- Nova Scotia Heritage Day
- Military history of Nova Scotia
