= Michael Ophovius =

Bishop of s'Hertogenbosch (1570–1637)

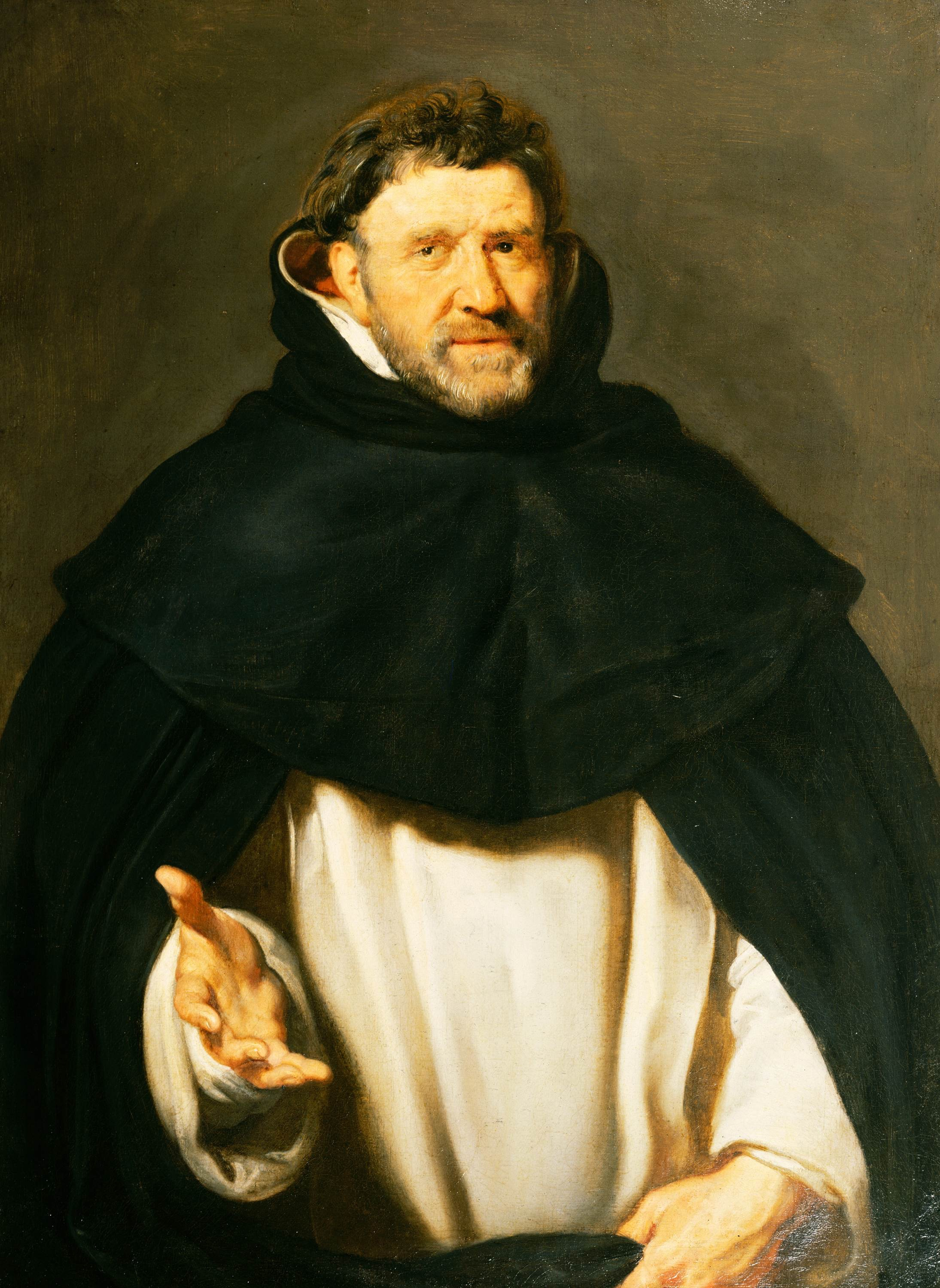
Portrait of Michael Ophovius by Peter Paul Rubens, around 1616

Michael Ophovius or Van Ophoven (1570–1637) was the sixth bishop of 's-Hertogenbosch in the Low Countries.

== Life ==
Ophovius was born in 's-Hertogenbosch, one of the four chief cities of the Duchy of Brabant in the Habsburg Netherlands. At the age of 15 he joined the Dominican Order in Antwerp. He taught eloquence at the order's house of studies in Leuven and later became a professor of theology at the University of Bologna. He returned to Leuven in 1601, and served as prior there, and then four terms as prior in Antwerp. From 1611 to 1615 he was provincial of Brabant, in that capacity taking part in the general chapter held in Paris in 1611. In 1623, while travelling in the Dutch Republic on family business, he transmitted a confidential message from the Brussels government to the Governor of Heusden, who had him arrested. He spent almost two years as a prisoner in The Hague.

In 1625 Ophovius was nominated bishop of 's-Hertogenbosch. He received episcopal consecration in Antwerp Cathedral on 17 September 1626, the principal consecrator being Jacobus Boonen, assisted by Johannes Malderus, bishop of Antwerp, and Antoon Triest, bishop of Ghent. Ophovius made his solemn entry into his see on 30 October. He not only governed his own diocese but was also involved in promoting the Holland Mission and Dominican missions to Denmark and Norway. On 18 April 1629 he met with the papal nuncio in Brussels to discuss developing missionary activity in Northern Europe, but in the same year, 's-Hertogenbosch was besieged and conquered by Frederick Henry, Prince of Orange, and on 12 November 1629 Ophovius became an exile from his native city and episcopal see. He was initially given refuge in Nieuw-Herlaer Castle, and on 23 March 1630 moved to Geldrop Castle, where he resided until 1635 as the guest of Amandus II van Horne. In August 1630 and 1631 he took part in meetings of bishops from the Low Countries in Brussels.

Early in 1635, Ophovius moved his base to Postel Abbey, and late in 1636 he finally settled at the Dominican house in Lier, where he died on 4 November 1637. At the time of his death he was nearly destitute, not leaving enough money to pay his own funeral expenses. He was buried in the Dominican church in Antwerp, to the left of the high altar, and a magnificent tomb was erected, designed by Rubens, a close personal friend who had painted several portraits of him. His funeral sermon was preached by Hyacinthus Choquet.

== Publications ==
- D. Catharinae Senensis vita ac miracula selectoria formis aeneis expressa (Antwerp, 1603)
- Regulae confraternitatis nominù Jesu (Antwerp, 1608)
- A. Frenken, ed., "Het Dagboek van Michaël Ophovius, 4 augustus 1629 - einde 1631", Bossche Bijdragen, 15/1-3 (1938), pp. 1–340.
