= Van Coeverden =

van Coeverden
- noble family
- Country: Netherlands
- Founded: 13th century
- Founder: Hendrik van Borculo
- Titles: baron, jonkheer

Van Coeverden is one of the oldest aristocratic families in the Netherlands.

== History ==
The family was already noble from the earliest times ("Uradel"). The family's history began with Hendrik van Borculo, who in 1231 married Eufemia, a daughter of the lord of Coevorden, a municipality in the Drenthe province. Their grandson, Reinolt, started to call himself van Coeverden, after his grandmother. From this time till the 17th century, the family played an important role in the region.

Reinolt's descendants still carry this name and belong to the Dutch nobility. In 1814, three members of the family were given the title of Jonkheer. In 1991, 1992, 1993, and 2009, several members of the family were given the title of baron. Near the end of 2018, another family member acquired the title of baron.

== Coat of arms ==
The coat of arms of the family is in gold 3 red eagles (2:1). The family's motto is En Dieu mon espérence et mon epée à ma défence. (In God my hope and my sword to the defense).

== Literature ==
- Detlev Schwennicke, Europäische Stammtafeln Band XXVII (2012) Tafel 82.
