= Tuyll =

Dutch noble family

van Tuyll
- noble family
- Country: Netherlands
- Founded: 15th century
- Founder: Pieter Hugensz
- Motto: Virtus vim vincit (Virtue defeats force)

The Tuyll family is a Dutch noble family, with familial and historical links to England, whose full name is Van Tuyll van Serooskerken. Several knights, members of various courts, literary figures, generals, ambassadors, statesmen and explorers carried the family name.

== History ==
=== 15th Century ===
Traditionally, the Van Tuyll van Serooskerken family claimed to be descendants of a very old, Van Tuyll (van Bulckesteyn) family of ancient nobility from Guelders, documented to 1125 and extinct in 1673.

This claim is based on among others the 1556 archive documenting the name change from Van Tuyll to van Serooskerken in the Zuylen castle (see under the Diplomas section), and is found continuously in all documents such as the 1603 charter they are from the same family (see below), the 1640 book 't Begin van Hollant in Dordrecht, page 306, by Johan van Beverwijck, the 1675 Rombout Verhulst monument to Hieronymus van Tuyll, the 1685 Batavia Illustrata of Simon van Leeuwen, the 1696 Nieuwe Cronyk Van Zeeland of Mattheus Smallegange, the 1822 recognition by the High Council of Nobility, three genealogies by van Spaen (1802), Rietstap (1887) and Polvliet (1894), the reference publication of the time, Jaarboek van den Nederlandschen adel, 6e Jaargang (1894) showing the full genealogy of the different branches, up to the first edition of the Adelsboek in 1906, but not in later modern editions. All reference works on Belle van Zuylen (Isabelle van Tuyll) support the van Tuyll van Bulckesteyn connection and so do French genealogists.

However, there is no primary source archival evidence for this thesis apart from that cited above, and given that from 1483 to 1603 the Van Tuyll van Serooskerken family merely used the name of Van Serooskerke and from 1759 Van Serooskerken, and never the name Van Tuyll (except in the name change archive of 1556), most modern Dutch historians conclude that this is a later fabrication of more ancient noble roots for the family. In particular, Dr. J.G. Smit makes the hypothesis that Hendrik Van Tuyll van Serooskerken paid Willem Van Tuyl van Bulckesteyn to sign the 1603 charter that they share the same coat of arms and are of the same family. The family Van Serooskerken then started to use the name Van Tuyll van Serooskerken. Hendrik Van Tuyll van Serooskerken commissioned Hendrick Bloemaert for a series of portraits of his ancestors. The likenesses are invented as even the Orange-Nassau did not have portraits dating that far. These portraits are all shown in the Netherlands institute for art history www.rkd.nl.

The proven family tree starts with a Pieter (1430–1492) heer van Welland son of Hugo and mayor of Zierikzee, who married in 1456 Cornelia van Haemstede, direct descendant of Witte van Haemstede, of the today extinct counts of Holland and in 1483 bought the Serooskerke manor from Maximilian of Austria.

=== 16th century ===
Hieronymus van Serooskerke (1510–1571), viscount of Zeeland, married Elisabeth Micault daughter of Jean, treasurer (one of the four officers) of the Order of the Golden Fleece. His tomb is in the Church of Stavenisse.

His eldest son, Philibert (died 1579), viscount of Zeeland, was made lord of a second Serooskerke (in Walcheren), hence the final n in Serooskerken, and was governor of Bergen-op-Zoom since 1572. The lordship of Serooskerke in Walcheren was granted by Charles V, Holy Roman Emperor and King of Spain.

Hendrik van Tuyll (1574–1627) was ambassador to the court of England and member of the highest council, the Raad van State (founded in 1531). His son Hendrik Jacob was also member of the council from 1690.

=== 17th century ===
In 1623, King James I of England gave Philibert van Tuyll (died 1661) the right to carry a rose extracted from the royal coat of arms and bearing the crown of England on the family coat of arms.

In 1641, Gerard van Honthorst painted the young Hieronymus and Frederik van Tuyll.

=== 18th century ===
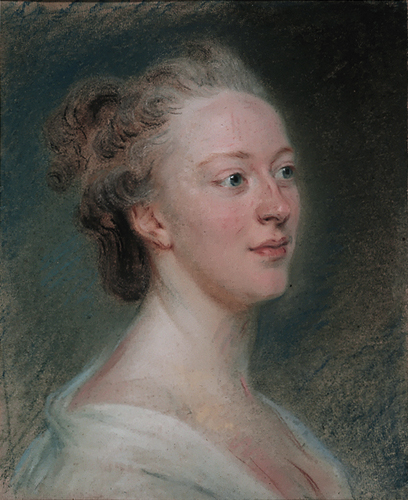
Isabelle de Charrière 1766, Musée d'Art et d'Histoire (Geneva).

Jan van Tuyll (1710–1762), baron of Heeze and Leende, lord of Vleuten, married Ursulina van Reede (1719–1747), daughter of Frederik, 2nd Earl of Athlone, and Henriette, countess of Nassau, daughter of William Nassau de Zuylestein, 1st Earl of Rochford.

Isabelle van Tuyll (1740–1805) an 18th-century author, also known as Belle van Zuylen and Isabelle de Charrière, was the daughter of Diederik van Tuyll (1706–1776) born in the castle of Zuylen. Her mother Jacoba Helena de Vicq was the daughter and orphan of Rene de Vicq, mayor of Amsterdam and administrator of the Dutch West India Company. Her work displays fine psychological analysis and a portrait of manners anticipating early 19th-century emancipated ideas, though she was opposed to revolutionary radicalism. The highest skyscraper planned in the Netherlands was to be called Belle van Zuylen toren (tower) but was cancelled in 2010.

Frederik van Tuyll (1742–1805) was colonel of the cavalry regiment van Tuyll van Serooskerken (1777–1793).

From 1768–83 Baroness Marie Katharina van Tuyll van Serooskerken of Knyphausen (Germany), after the death of her husband, Count Christian Frederik Bentinck (1734–1768) (son of Charlotte-Sophie von Aldenburg und Knyphausen and Willem Bentinck, Count Bentinck from 1732), was Regent Dowager for their son, Wilhelm II Gustav van Bentinck (1762–35), who reigned 1768–1810, 1813 and 1818–35. The territory was annexed to the Netherlands in 1810 and occupied by Russia 1813–18. Marie Katharina lived 1743–98.

Jan Maximiliaan van Tuyll (1771–1843) was the governor of Utrecht and then the first governor of North Holland. He married Louise van Hardenbroek, daughter of Johan van Hardenbroek and Countess Susanne d'Aumale (see Duc d'Aumale).

=== 19th century ===
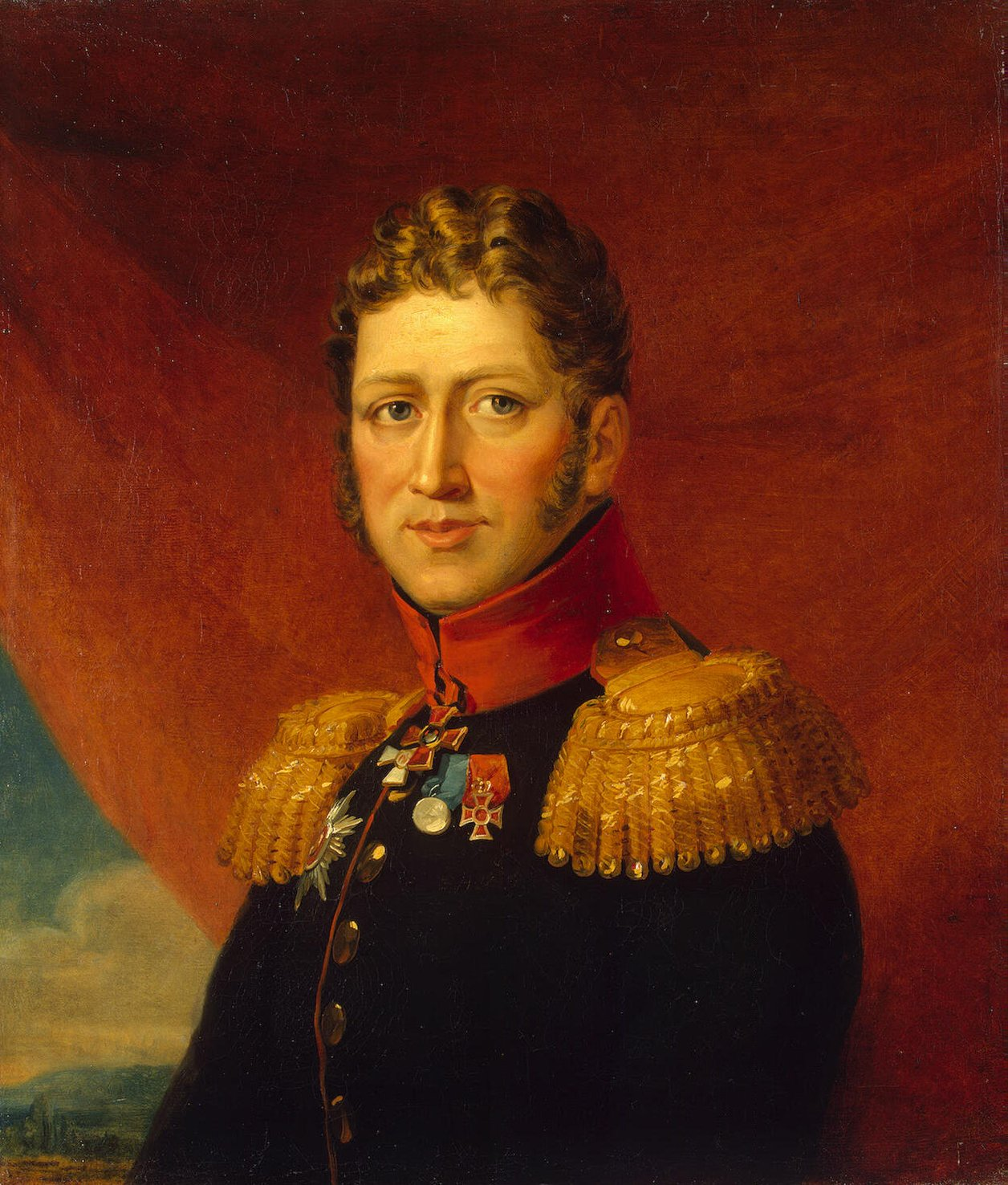
Diederik Jacob van Tuyll van Serooskerken, Major General in the Russian army

In 1822, The High Council of Nobility declared members of the family were competent since early times to carry the oldest title of nobility, baron. They are "noblesse immemoriale", without ennoblement, predating 1351, from when on nobles of non-knightly origin were created in Italy. This does not correspond with the modern Dutch genealogists view that the family was originally a patrician, but not ancient noble family.

The "baron de Tuyll", Diederik Jacob van Tuyll van Serooskerken (1772–1826), was a Major General in the Russian army, Russian envoy at the court of the King of Portugal and Brazil, and from 1815 Russian plenipotentiary to the Holy See. He had colloquies in regard to the union of the two Churches, and from 1822 to 1827, was Russian minister to the United States and resident of Decatur House. He represented the Holy Alliance in the United States. As a consequence of his stay, a part of the silver collection of the White House carries the family coat of arms. His four children bore the surname "Baron van Tuyll van Serooskerken".

His grandson Carel Lodewijk van Tuyll (1784-1835), in recognition of services rendered during the Napoleonic Wars, was permitted to purchase 4000 acres of land from the Canada Company in 1832 and founded the town of Bayfield, Ontario. In 1851, his son Vincent Gildemeester van Tuyll (1812–1860), in partnership with Prince Henry of Orange, joined John F. Loudon in the discovery of the biggest tin deposit until today on the island of Billiton. Together they founded what is now the world's largest diversified resources company, Billiton.

Vincent's son Reginald van Tuyll (1845–1903) may have inspired the eponymous character in Pelham Grenville Wodehouse's book Indiscretions of Archie, 1921. He married in 1881 Countess Anna Mathilda van Limburg Stirum after the death of the Crown Prince Willem of the Netherlands (1840–1879), who had been refused permission to marry her.

A memorial to Vincent's grandson Francis Charles Owen (1885-1952) can be found in the parish church of St James the Elder, Horton.

General Sir William Tuyll (died 1864) was a British army officer, and another of the military members of the family.

== Family castles and Heerlijkheid (seignories) ==
- Coelhorst
- Geldrop Castle
- Groenewoude
- Heeze
- Moermond Castle
- Nederhorst Castle
- Oudenburch
- Palmesteyn
- Rijnestein
- Rijnhuizen Castle
- Ringelenstein
- Schorestein
- Stavenisse
- Ter Meer castle also Huis Ter Meer, Zuylenburg or Slot te Maarssen
- Tuyll
- Vleuten see also (Hamtoren)
- Vogelenburg
- Vollehove
- Vreeland
- Welland, near Noordwelle in Schouwen-Duiveland
- Wulven
- Slot Zuylen

Historic houses without lordship

- City-Palace van Huguetan / van Tuyll
- Clingendael House
- Fritwell Manor (Oxfordshire)
- Little Sodbury Manor
- Rijgersbergen House

== Other possessions ==
Serooskerke (Schouwen), Serooskerke (Walcheren), St. Annaland, Zoelekerke, Popkensburg, Tienhoven, Maelstede, Cappelle, Bieslinge, Schore, Vlake, Westbroek, IJzendoorn, Leende, Zesgehuchten, Rhenoy

== Diplomas ==
- 1547: act of nomination of Hieronymus to viscount of Zeeland by Charles V (Inventaris van het archief van de familie Van Wassenaer van Duvenvoorde, 1226–1996, J.C. Kort, Nationaal Archief, Den Haag, 2002)
- August 23, 1556: new coat of arms and lordship of Serooskerke in Walcheren granted by Charles V, Holy Roman Emperor and King of Spain, together with the change of family name from van Tuyll to van Serooskerken by his father Jacob (824 Akte van bevestiging door keizer Karel V voor Jeronimus van Serooskerke van de door diens vader Jacob ingevoerde naamswijziging van Van Tuyll in Van Serooskerke, en van de verandering in het familiewapen).
- 1603 Hendrik van Tuyll van Serooskerken and Willem van Tuyll van Bulckestein sign a charter they are from the same family as they carry the same name and coat of arms.
- February 1, 1623: English rose added to the coat of arms by James I King of England, Scots and Ireland.
- March 24, 1640: admitted to the ridderschap of Utrecht.
- 1822: recognition that members of the family were competent since early times to carry the oldest title of nobility, baron, by William I of the Netherlands, king of the United Kingdom of the Netherlands (including Belgium) and grand duke of Luxembourg.

== Coat of arms ==
Shield: three talbot hounds, crest: talbot, coronet above the helmet, various helmets depending on the source, mantling, with the earliest form of supporters, two wildmen. On 1 February 1623, King James I of England granted an extraordinary hereditary heraldic augmentation to Philibert van Tuyll van Serooskerken following high-level diplomatic engagements between the Low Countries and the English Court. The royal decree granted the family the right to place a Tudor Rose charged with the Crown of England directly into their coat of arms. In European and British heraldry, a sovereign permitting a subject and even more a non-subject to bear a core device pulled directly from the Royal Arms of England was an exceptionally rare honor.

== Gallery ==
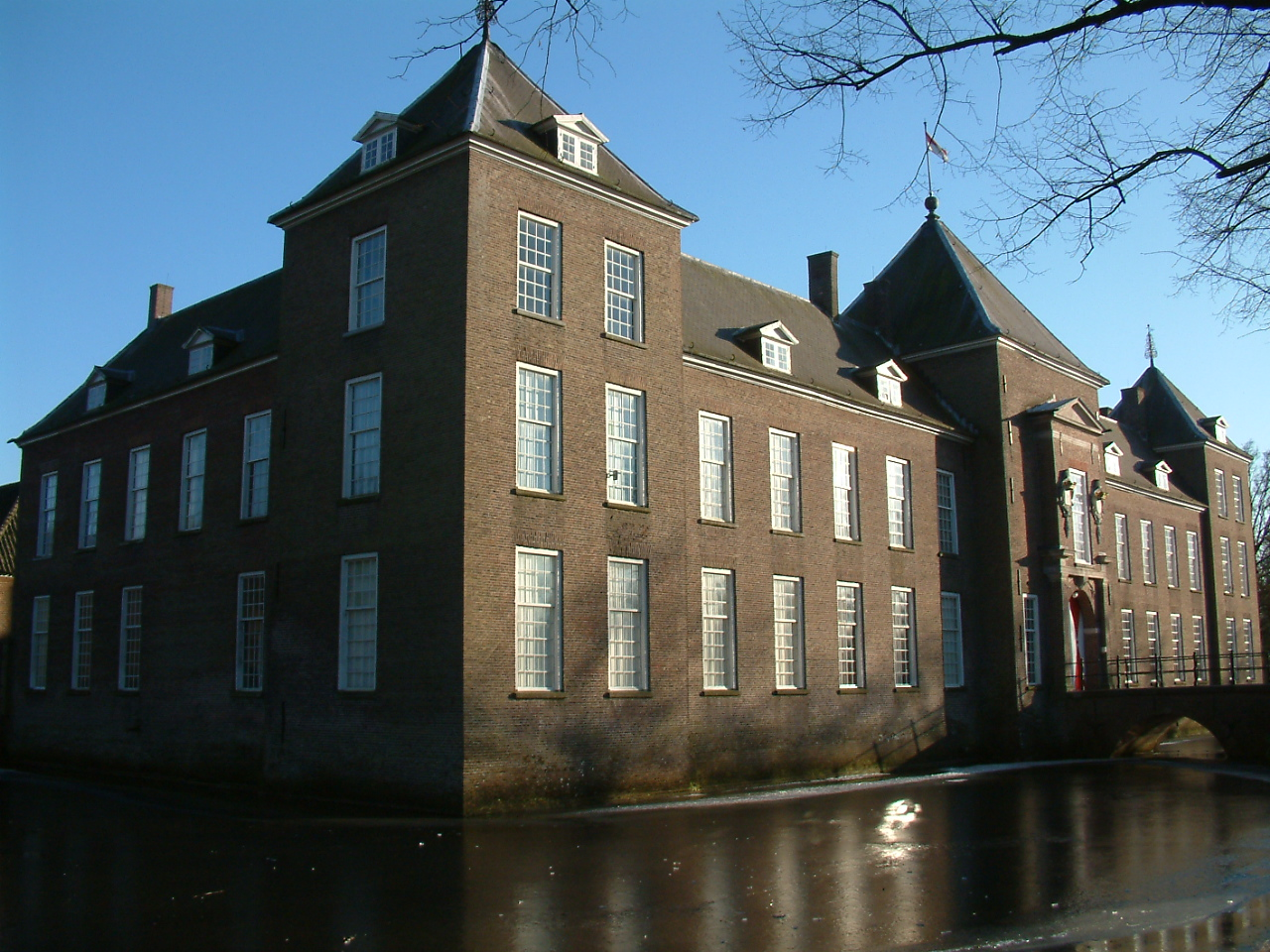
Heeze Castle

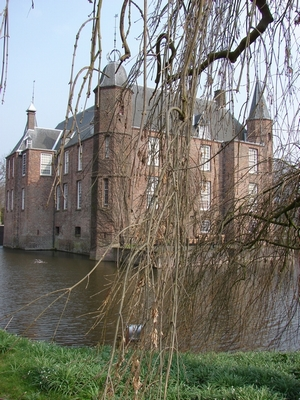
Slot Zuylen

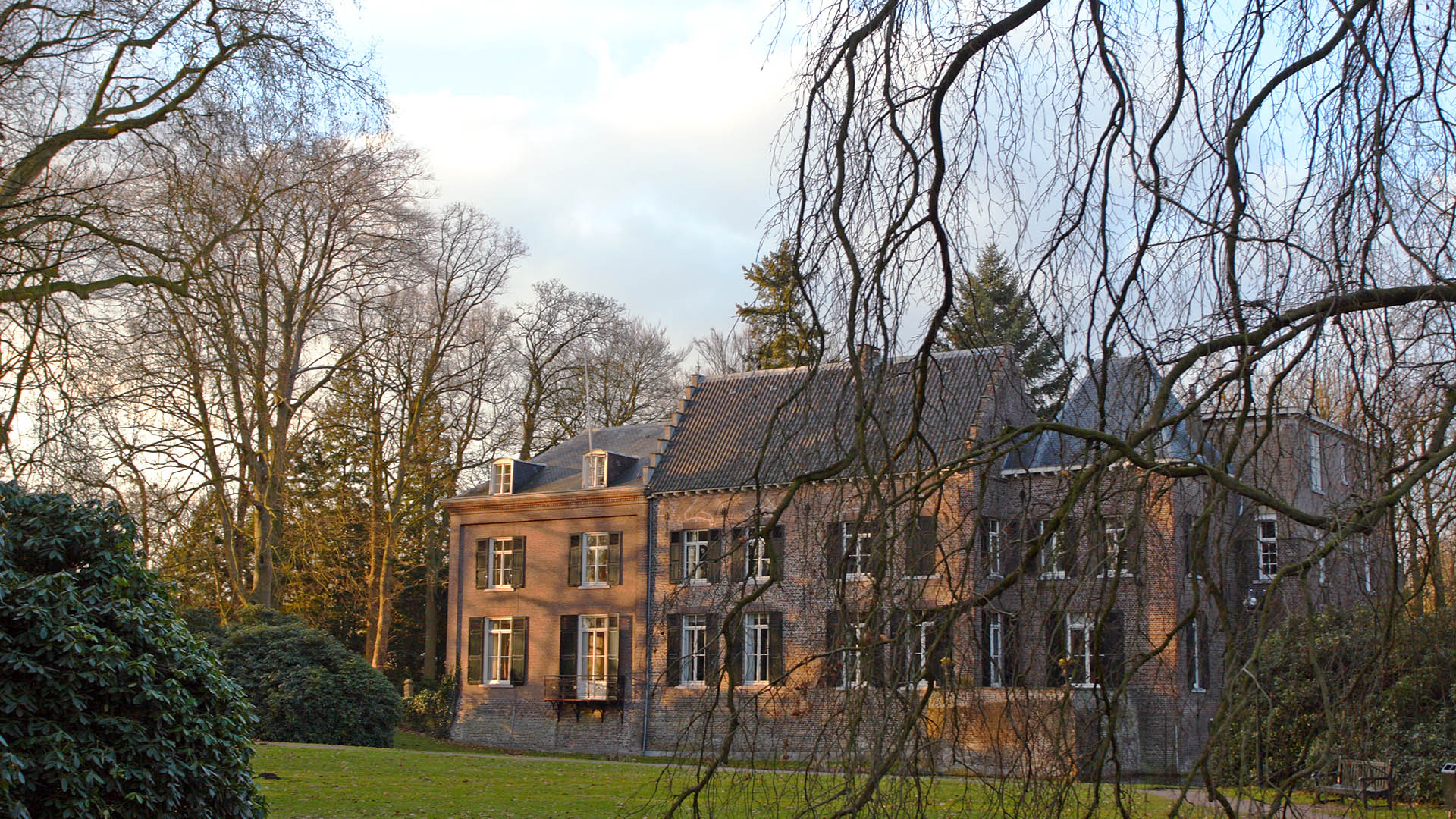
Geldrop Castle

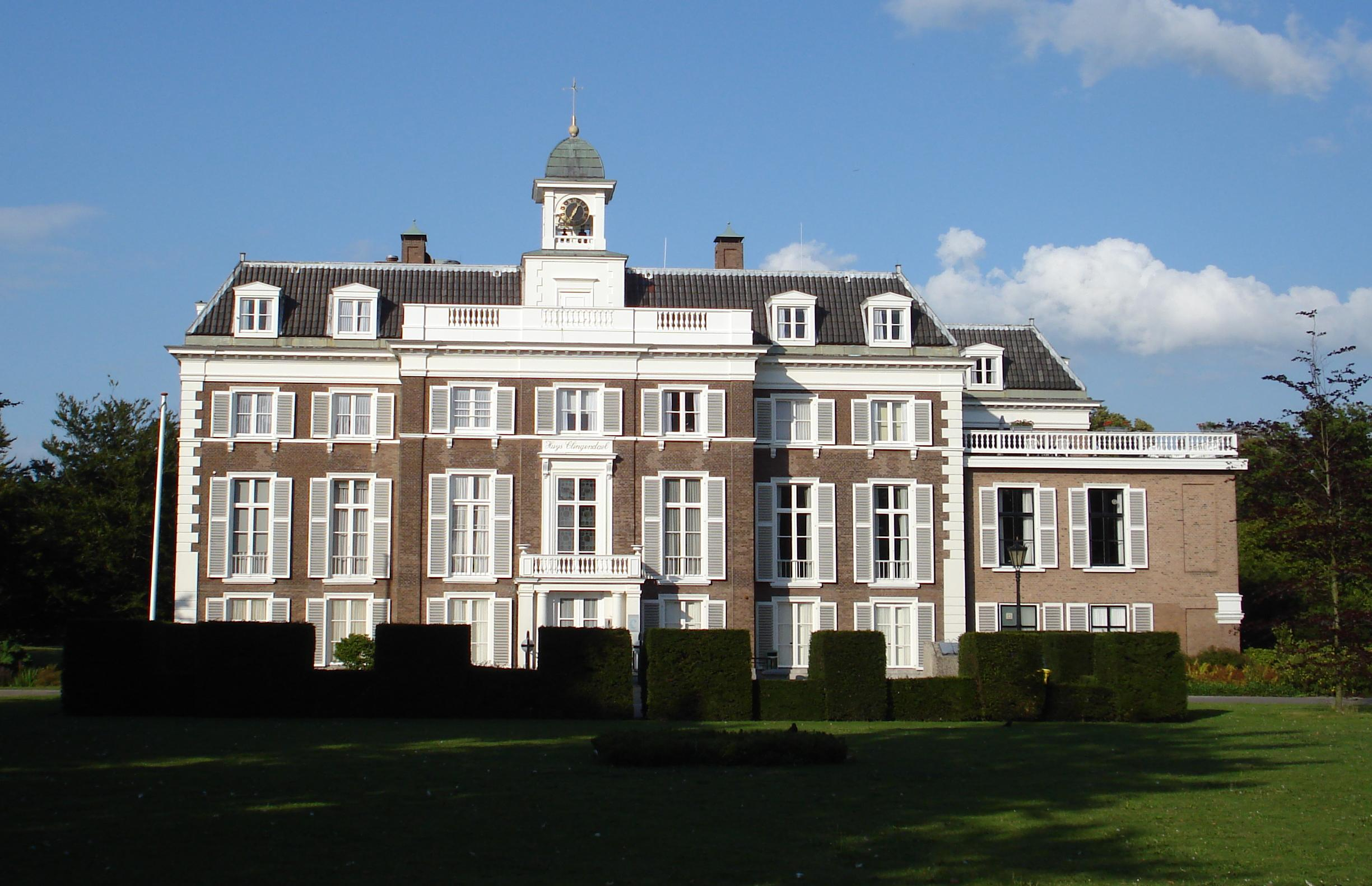
Clingendael House

Coat of Arms
