= Pim van Boetzelaer van Oosterhout =

Dutch diplomat and politician

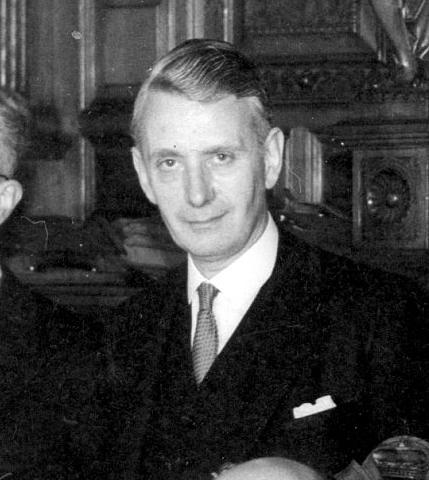
Pim van Boetzelaer van Oosterhout in 1946

Carel Godfried Willem Hendrik (Pim), Baron van Boetzelaer van Oosterhout (17 November 1892, in Amersfoort – 20 May 1986, in Ubbergen) was a Dutch diplomat and politician.

Van Boetzelaer van Oosterhout's father was mayor of Leusden. After studying at Utrecht University and obtaining a Master of Laws at the University of Amsterdam in 1921, he held many diplomatic positions abroad including in Washington DC (1926–29), Mexico City (1929–30), Brussels (1930-1934), and Berlin (1934-1940). After the German invasion of the Netherlands he led the diplomatic affairs in London from May to August 1940 after which he became ambassador for the Netherlands in Washington DC.

He held this position until he was asked, as a non-partisan, to become Minister of Foreign Affairs in the first Beel cabinet (3 July 1946 to 7 August 1948). As minister he voted in August 1947 against expansion of military actions in the Dutch East Indies, pushed through laws enabling the Benelux treaties, signed the Organisation for European Economic Co-operation and the subsequent Marshall Plan contracts, and prepared the way for the NATO by signing the Treaty of Brussels in March 1948.

He was Ambassador to France from the 1st December of 1948, to the 1st December of 1957.
