= Nieuw-Herlaer Castle =

- Kasteel Nieuw-Herlaer
- Haanwijk, Halder, the Netherlands
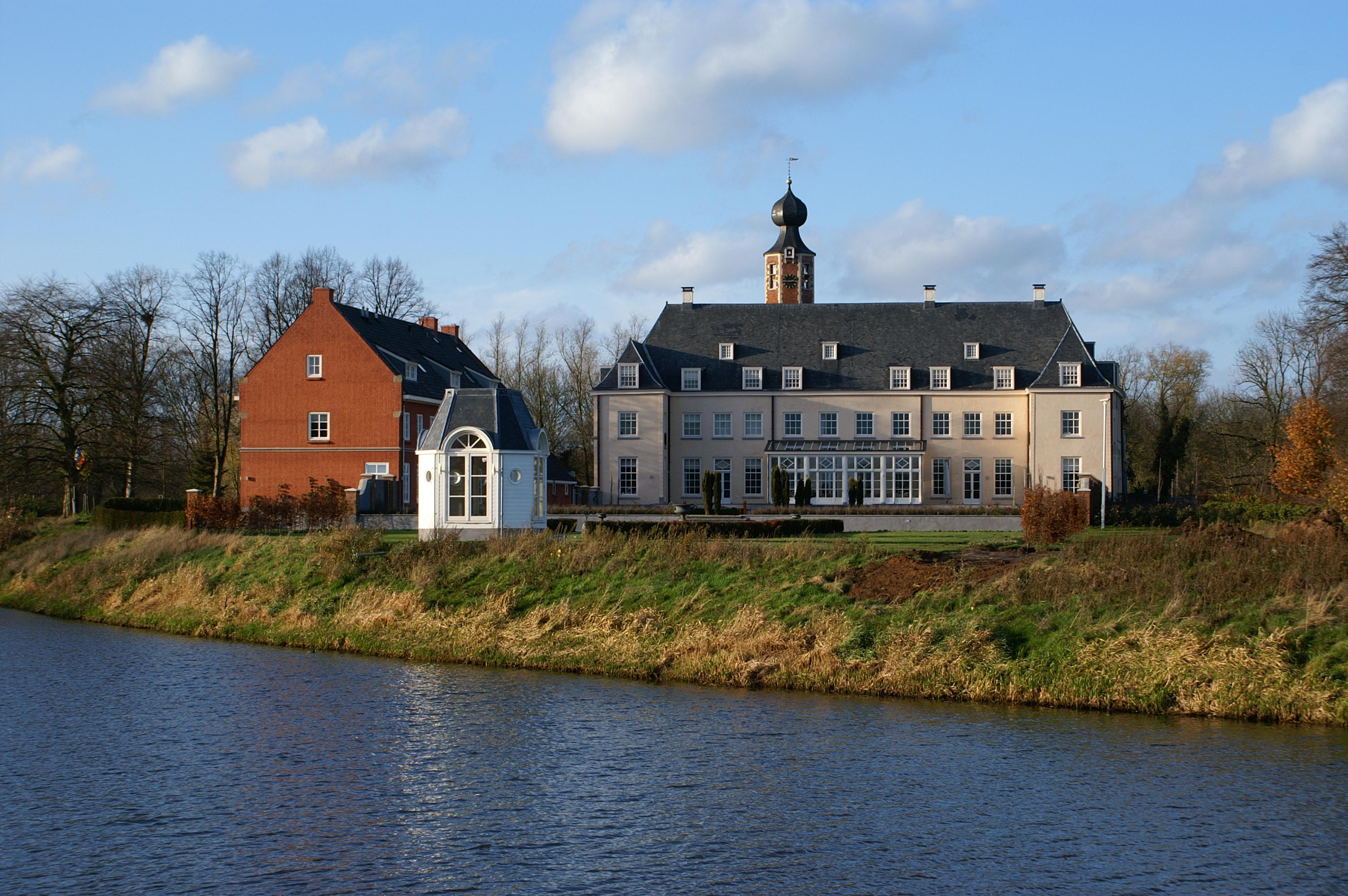
- Nieuw-Herlaar in 2010, from across the Dommel

Site information
- Type: Castle
- Owner: private
- Open to the public: no
- Condition: Current mansion includes small tower

Location
- The Netherlands
- Coordinates: 51.650478°N 5.325181°E

Site history
- Built: before 1381

Nieuw-Herlaer Castle is a manor in Sint-Michielsgestel, the Netherlands. It contains a tower which was part of the preceding castle.

== Location ==
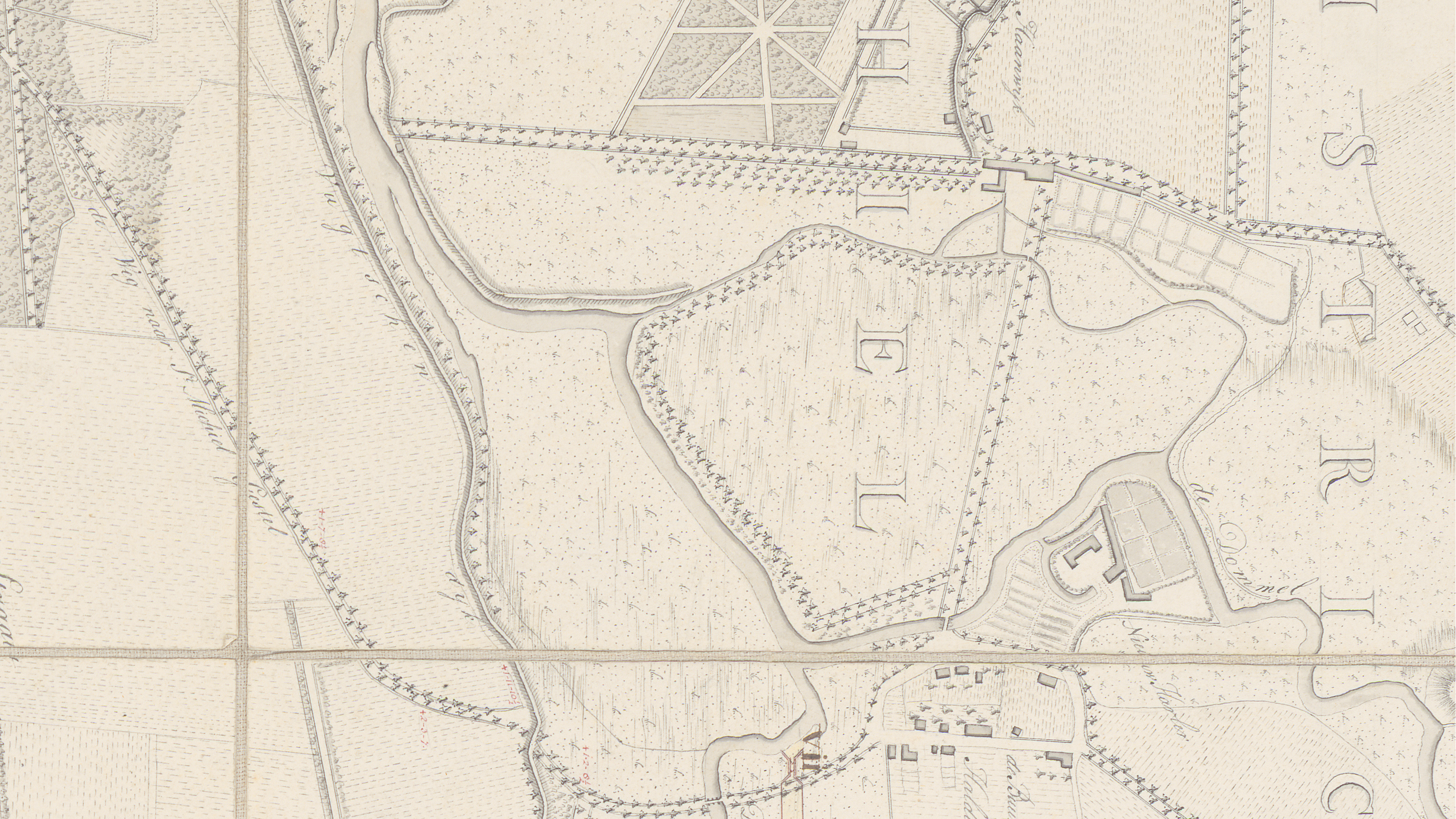
The Dommel flows north of Nieuw-Herlaer Castle in 1801.

Nieuw-Herlaar Castle is on the east bank of the Dommel, about a hundred meters from the hamlet Halder, to which it is connected by a bridge. Nieuw-Herlaer Castle was a loan from the Lordship Herlaer, which centered on Oud Herlaer Castle. Oud Herlaer Castle is only about one kilometer to the north and is very close to Maurick Castle in Vught. Haanwijk manor is only 400 meters to the north. Haanwijk Manor is not a true castle, but it has the medieval tower 't Vaantje on the estate grounds. The castle density in the area seems remarkable.

In the past the proximity between Nieuw-Herlaar Castle and Oud Herlaer Castle was more logical than it now seems to be. Nieuw-Herlaer was on the west bank of the Dommel, and Oud Herlaer on the east bank. That is, the Dommel flowed just north of Nieuw-Herlaar Castle. Thus from a military perspective, Nieuw-Herlaar Castle was close to Maurick Castle in Vught, also on the west bank of the Dommel. The Esschestroom was between these castles, which belonged to opposing parties when they were founded.

A drawing from 1801 is very instructive to understand the location of Nieuw-Herlaar Castle on the Dommel. It also makes old pictures of the castle understandable. The map easily compares to a modern map. The very small wings (cf. the 2010 photograph) of the current mansion, which protrude to the south/southeast help to understand it.

== The Building ==
The current building has little to do with the medieval castle. A high stair tower which used to be on the south side of the main building of the medieval castle is now part of the northern façade of a late eighteenth-century building. There are multiple pictures of the 17th and 18th-century situation, showing that it was indeed a true castle with a square layout with an inner court surrounded by a moat. The best picture of the medieval castle might be a fragment of a 1629 map (cf. below), showing what seems to be a large defendable tower. Such a structure would be in line with the repeated use of the castle in the Eighty Years' War but should be confirmed by research.

== Early history of the castle ==
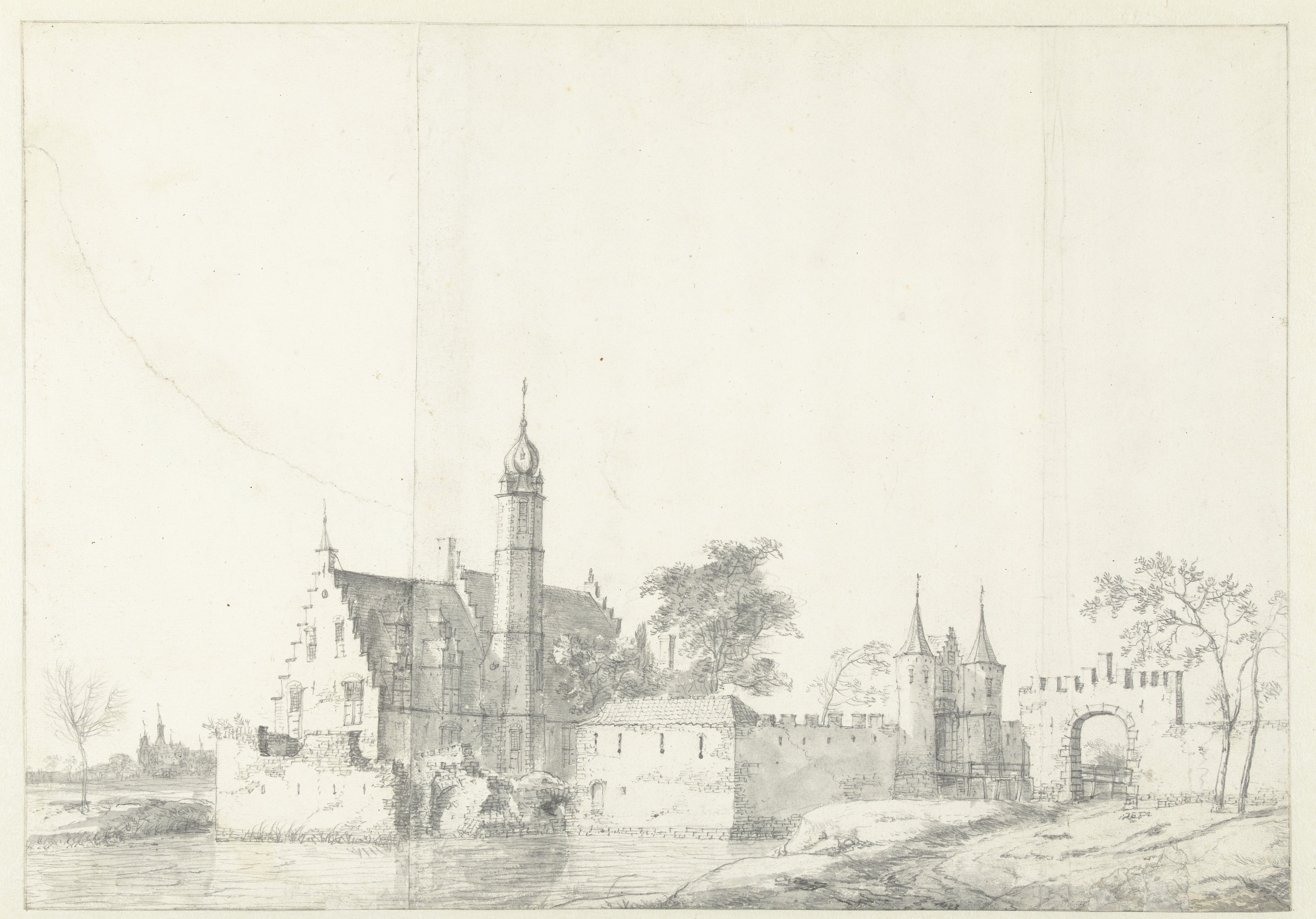
Drawing dated 1637–1692, cf. the 1801 map

=== Foundation ===
In 2008 an archaeological excavation at the castle grounds uncovered walls of 1.3 m thick in a brick size corresponding to the late 14th century. It was probably a fragment of the outer wall of Nieuw-Herlaer. The find confirmed that Nieuw-Herlaer was a defensible castle. Dendrochronological dating confirmed woodwork from 1300, and findings of a foundation made from re-used tuff probably push back the foundation date of Nieuw-Herlaer even further.

=== The first known Lords of Herlaer ===
The first lord of Nieuw-Herlaer was Willem van der Aa. He was succeeded by his son Floris van der Aa, who was in turn succeeded by his son Willem van der Aa. This information is known from the loan register of the Lordship Oud Herlaer. Nieuw-Herlaer was then described as being a court surrounded by the Dommel. The right to appoint a priest in the chapel on the courtyard was retained by the Lord of (Oud) Herlaer.

Willem van der Aa Florisson transferred Nieuw-Herlaer to Jan die Joede for two ground rents, one of 100 Electoral Rhine guilders, and one of 100 Rhine guilders for him and his nephew Goyart van der Aa Gerritszn at Zegenwerp. In 1418 Willem van der Aa Florisson transferred the latter ground rent to Isabel van Zevenbergen. Isabel married Anthony van Glymes in 1447. After not paying the ground rent Jan die Joede transferred Nieuw-Herlaer to Anthony van Glymes in 1447. The couple then transferred Nieuw-Herlaer to Hendrik van der Aa Gerritsz., who was registered as lord on 7 August 1449. Willem van der Aa Florisson then relinquished all his claims on Nieuw-Herlaer to Hendrik van der Aa Gerritsz. By 1451 Hendrik had made the final payment for Nieuw-Herlaer. He was married to Margriet Oem van Arkel, heiress of Bokhoven Castle. Margriet would get a usufruct on Nieuw-Herlaer, which was transferred to her sister Cornelia wife of Jan van Renesse.

In 1492 Jan van Baexen became the new lord. He was married to Elisabeth van Harff. In 1500 the loan was split. Half of it went to the three brothers of Jan and their descendants, each getting one-sixth. The other half went to Willem Hinckart and Goyert van Harff.

=== Proening van Deventer family ===
On 21 December 1532 Aelbrecht Proening, called Van Deventer got Nieuw-Herlaer. He was from a 's-Hertogenbosch family. In 1493 his father Gerard had lived on the Pensmarkt in 's-Hertogenbosch. In 1517 Gerard was raised to the nobility. After becoming lord of Nieuw-Herlaer Aelbrecht was living in Antwerp in 1541, and had died by 1554. In that year his widow Anna Vijghe and his younger brother Henrich got Nieuw-Herlaer. Henrich died in 1556, his widow in 1564. They were succeeded by Henrich's younger brother Jacob Proening van Deventer in 1557. He died in 1568.

== The Eighty Years' War ==
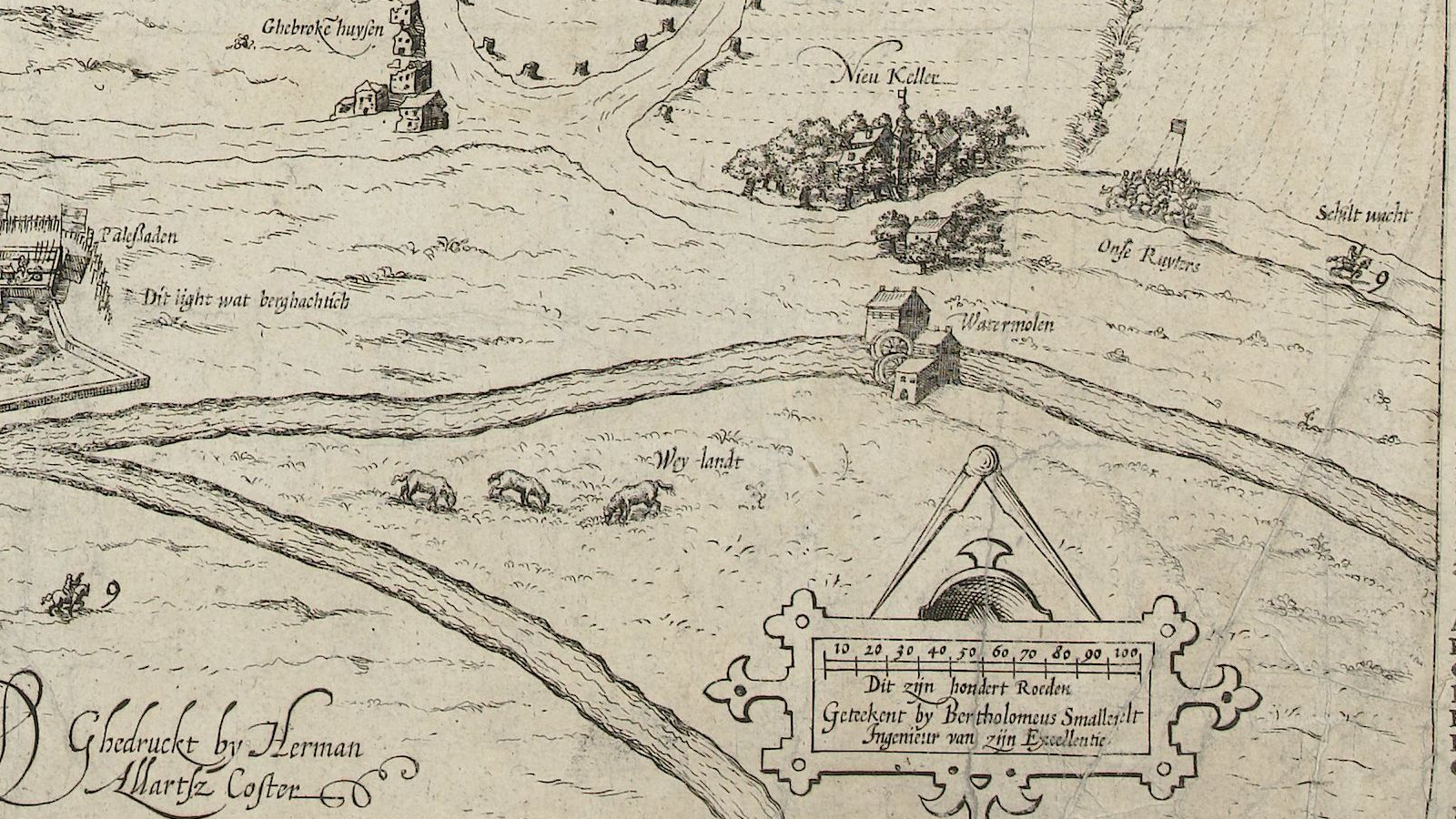
Nieuw-Herlaer in the 1603 siege of 's-Hertogenbosch.

=== Early phases of the war ===
Gerard Proening van Deventer, son of Jacob and Barabara Bax Johannesdaughter was a Calvinist and played a big role in the early stages of the Eighty Years' War. Gerard got Nieuw-Herlaer in December 1569 and was a schepen in 's-Hertogenbosch. In 1579 he announced that the city joined the Union of Utrecht. This led to a battle between the guilds on the market of the city, known as the Schermersoproer. Afterward, the Protestant citizens left the city. Gerard became a mayor in Utrecht and left the castle empty. Gerard was first married to Anna ab Angelis, with whom he had two daughters, Maria and Anna who both became Catholic again.

In November 1579 Claude de Berlaymont made Nieuw-Herlaer his headquarters for a few months, and had a garrison of soldiers from the 's-Hertogenbosch militia. In 1582 it was garrisoned by villagers, and later in 1582 again by the city militia. That year the garrisons of Vught and Nieuw-Herlaer totaled 30 men.

In 1586 the city militia garrisons in many places surrounding 's-Hertogenbosch, including Nieuw-Herlaer, were commanded by Captain Bontenos van der Sterre. In 1587 the Dutch Army invaded the Meierij in order to try and lift the Siege of Sluis (1587). In June it reached Veghel and Erp, southeast of 's-Hertogenbosch. Next it went to Sint-Oedenrode and returned to Capelle via Esch, moving south of 's-Hertogenbosch. Next, it turned back to the Meierij in order to destroy as much as possible. In June 1587 the Dutch army arrived before Loon op Zand Castle and took it after a week's siege. It next moved forward to the southeast, and on 1 July 1587, the Royalist garrisons of Nieuw-Herlaer and Nemerlaer Castle retreated. That same day Boxtel surrendered. The Dutch army would also take Eindhoven, but Helmond Castle put up a successful resistance. During the late sixteenth century the watermill of Halder, which was within sight of the castle, was very important for fulling wool cloth. It got a safeguard against plunder in 1596. It meant that inhabitants of the Meierij which paid contribution to the Dutch Republic could exercise this important economic activity at Halder without getting plundered.

=== 1601 and 1603 sieges of 's-Hertogenbosch ===
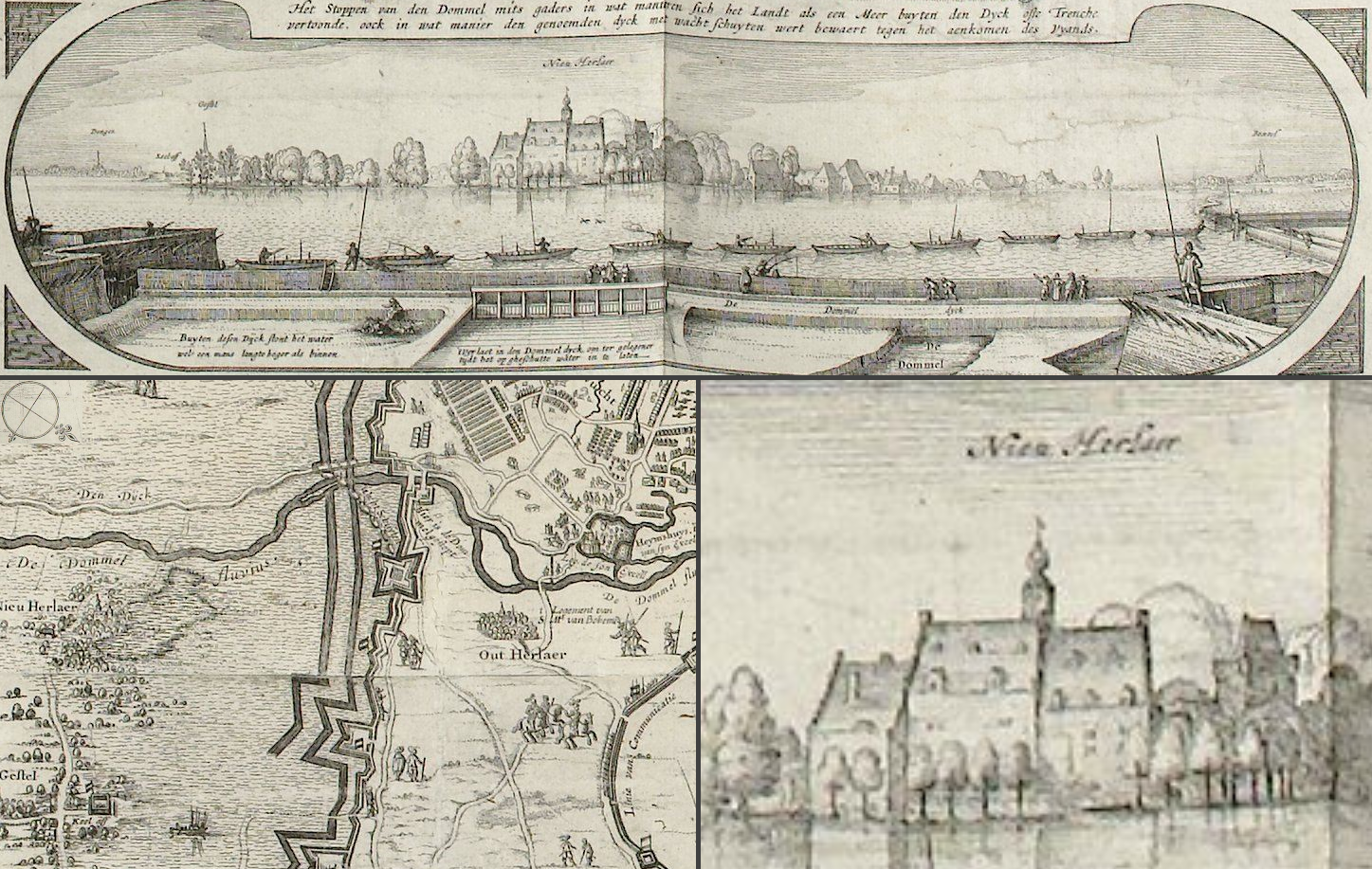
Nieuw-Herlaer in 1629

In 1601 Maurice, Prince of Orange besieged 's-Hertogenbosch for the first time. During this time the usual garrison for Nieuw-Herlaer was 25 men. In 1601 the 'Lord of the Castle' (cf. Warnard below) demanded command over the garrison, and obtained it, even though he lacked any military experience. It seems that Nieuw-Herlaer was already damaged by this time (cf. below).

In August–November 1603 Maurice besieged 's-Hertogenbosch for the second time. A map about the 1603 siege shows that Nieuw-Herlaer was taken by Maurice during the second siege. It's known that the map's depictions of Maurick Castle and Oud Herlaer Castle are accurate, and so the depiction of 'Nieu Keller' probably also refers to an actual situation. The depiction of the watermill as having two wheels supports this assumption. In 1610 the garrison of Nieuw-Herlaer was removed.

=== The Dutch Republic takes 's-Hertogenbosch ===
For Nieuw-Herlaer Castle the final stage of the Eighty Years' War was the conquest of 's-Hertogenbosch by the Dutch army in 1629. When Bishop Michael Ophovius had to leave 's-Hertogenbosch after it changed sides in 1629, he was kindly received at Nieuw-Herlaer. The event was a severe blow for the owners of Nieuw-Herlaer. As Catholics, they were henceforward excluded from office.

== Split Ownership ==
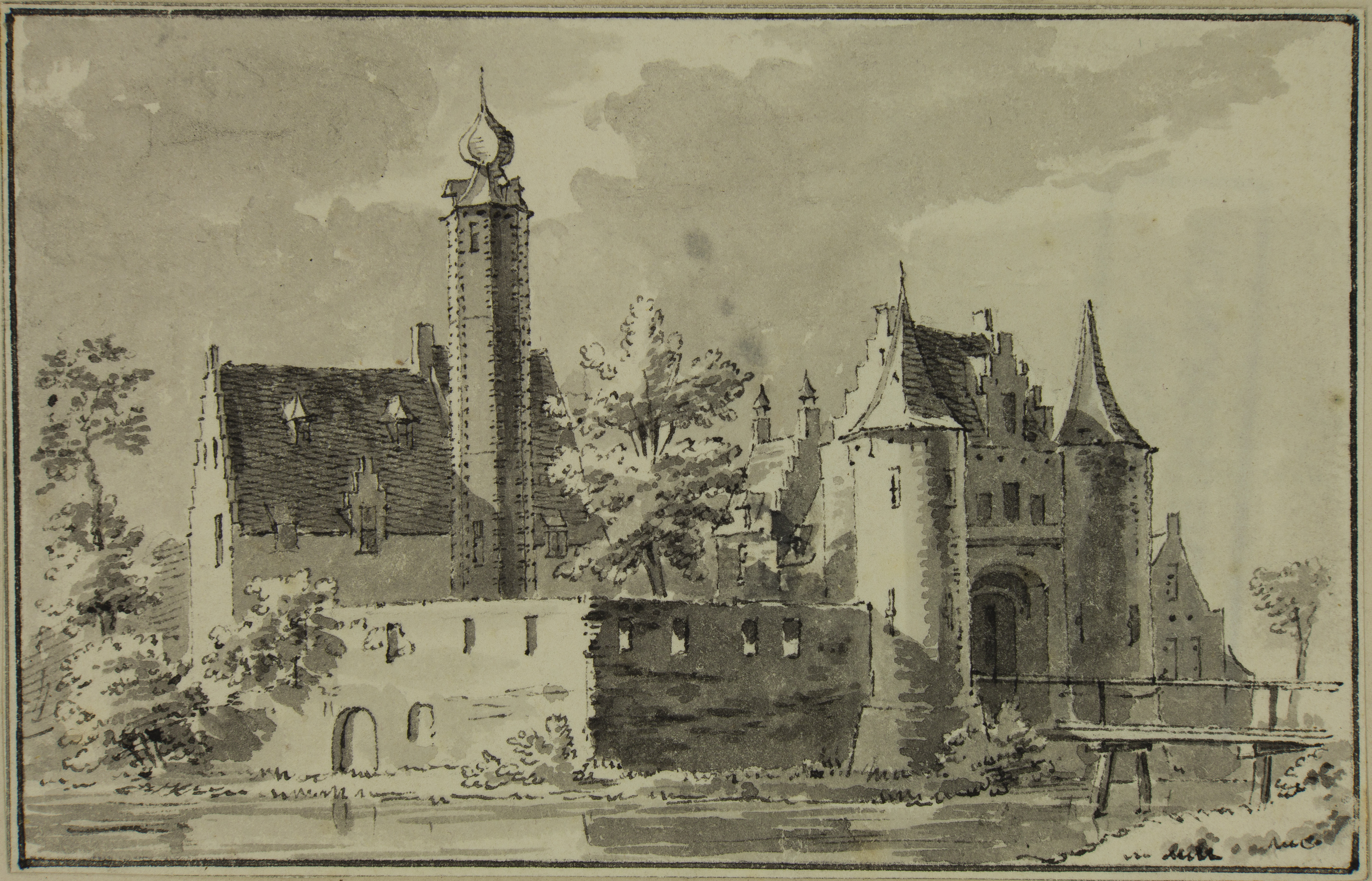
Nieuw-Herlaer in the 18th century

=== The ownership of Nieuw-Herlaer is split ===
During the first phases of the Eighty Years' War, the castle became the property of Maria and Anna Proening van Deventer, who had both become Catholic again. Maria would bring her half to the family Van den Broeck / Pybes d'Adema and successors. Anna would bring her half to the Van Honselaer's and later Van Gerwen's. The split in ownership continued for over a century and was probably quite detrimental to the castle.

=== Van de Broeck/Pybes d'Adema ===
Maria Proening (?–1639) inherited half of the estate from her father Gerard Proening van Deventer. She married Engelbert van de Broeck schout of Etten and Leur. She died in 1639, probably at Nieuw-Herlaer, because she was buried in the church of Sint-Michielsgestel. Her daughter Maria van den Broeck brought this half of the estate to Reynier Pybes d'Adema (?–1671). Reynier Pybes d'Adema was from a Frisian family that remained Catholic.

Carel Willem Pybes d'Adema (1650–1702) married Catharina Angelica Endevoets. Their oldest son Reynier (+c. 1689) became a fähnrich and died unmarried. His brother Wilhelm Wolfgang (c. 1691–1760) was retarded. Their younger brother François Nicolas next inherited the castle and died unmarried in 1773. The eighth sibling Johan Aemilius then inherited the castle and died in 1782.

His nephew Joseph Wolfgang Endevoets, cadet in the Dutch army and Lord of Zwanenburg next succeeded. He moved to Nieuw-Herlaer, and died there c. 1790. He was married to Jacoba van der Linden, who was probably a farmer's daughter. She next sold their half of the castle in 1789.

=== Van Honsealer/Van Gerwen ===
Gerard Proening van Deventer's daughter Anna inherited the other half of Nieuw-Herlaer. She married Warnard of Honselaer. Warnard was a royalist. In 1601 he got command of the 20-30 men strong garrison of Nieuw-Herlaer Castle. The governor of 's-Hertogenbosch also requested money for Warnard, so he could repair Nieuw-Herlaer.

By 1652 Warnard and his wife had died. Warnard and Anna's son Adolf was born c. 1601. He was noted as living at his estate Nieuw-Herlaer in 1637 and 1658. He died unmarried at Nieuw-Herlaer Castle in 1667. His share in Nieuw-Herlaer was then transferred to Dirk Millinck van Gerwen.

Adolf's sister Adriana van Honselaer first married Lambert Millinck van Gerwen. They had Lambert Millinck van Gerwen (?–1722), who married Catharina van Erp. Their son Lambert Johan van Gerwen (?–1720) married Petronella van Leeuwarden.

Adolf and Adriana's younger sister Maria married Dirk Millinck van Gerwen. They had (another) Lambert Millinck van Gerwen schout of Helmond. He got Adolf's half in the ownership of Nieuw-Herlaer in 1667. After the death of his mother, he was sworn in as lord for this part on 6 May 1675.

=== Partial demolishment in 1710 ===
In 1710 Lambert Millinck van Gerwen lived at Nieuw-Herlaer, and owned half of it together with Lambert Johan Millinck van Gerwen, who lived in Veghel. The other half of the castle was owned by the children of Carel d'Adama, whose mother lived in that half. That year Lambert and Lambert Johan ordered a partial demolishment of the castle including the great hall. It brought them into conflict with the owners of the other half, which would become unstable. It ended with an agreement to build a new facade on that side.

=== Ruysch Family ===
Johan Adriaan Ruysch presiding schepen of 's-Hertogenbosch bought half of Nieuw-Herlaer from Lambert Millinck van Gerwen and Lambert Johan Millinck van Gerwen in 1714 and 1716. Johan Adriaan had a son Christiaan Adriaan Ruysch, who lived at the castle in 1734. In 1734 he used this property as a mortgage, described as: 'A part of Nieuw-Herlaer Castle. On the east side of the demolished hall, including the basement of this hall. With moat and lanes, orchard, stables, shed, fishing pond and fishing rights, chapel, a brewery with comfortable house annexed to it, and some lands.'

In 1750 this half of the castle was auctioned. It was then described as: 'Half of a noble castle with multiple rooms, with a chapel, a house and a brewery with kettle and cask. Two small houses next to it. Fishing rights, grounds with an orchard, a fishing pond, two meadows, one of 3 and one of 25 morgen enclosed by the Dommel, and half of a terrain where rabbits could be hunted, a Warande.

It was bought by Herman Gideon Clemens. Protestant minister and teacher in 's-Hertogenbosch. He died childless in 1772. Nieuw-Herlaer was auctioned again, now as a country house previously called Nieuw-Herlaer Castle. The description stressed the garden, and the meadows were rented out separately. It was bought by Colonel Onno Tamminga, baron du Tour, who lived at Haanwijk Manor. He passed it on to Philip Willem baron de Schmeling, who was succeeded by the Prussian general Constantijn van Billerbeck.

== The current manor ==
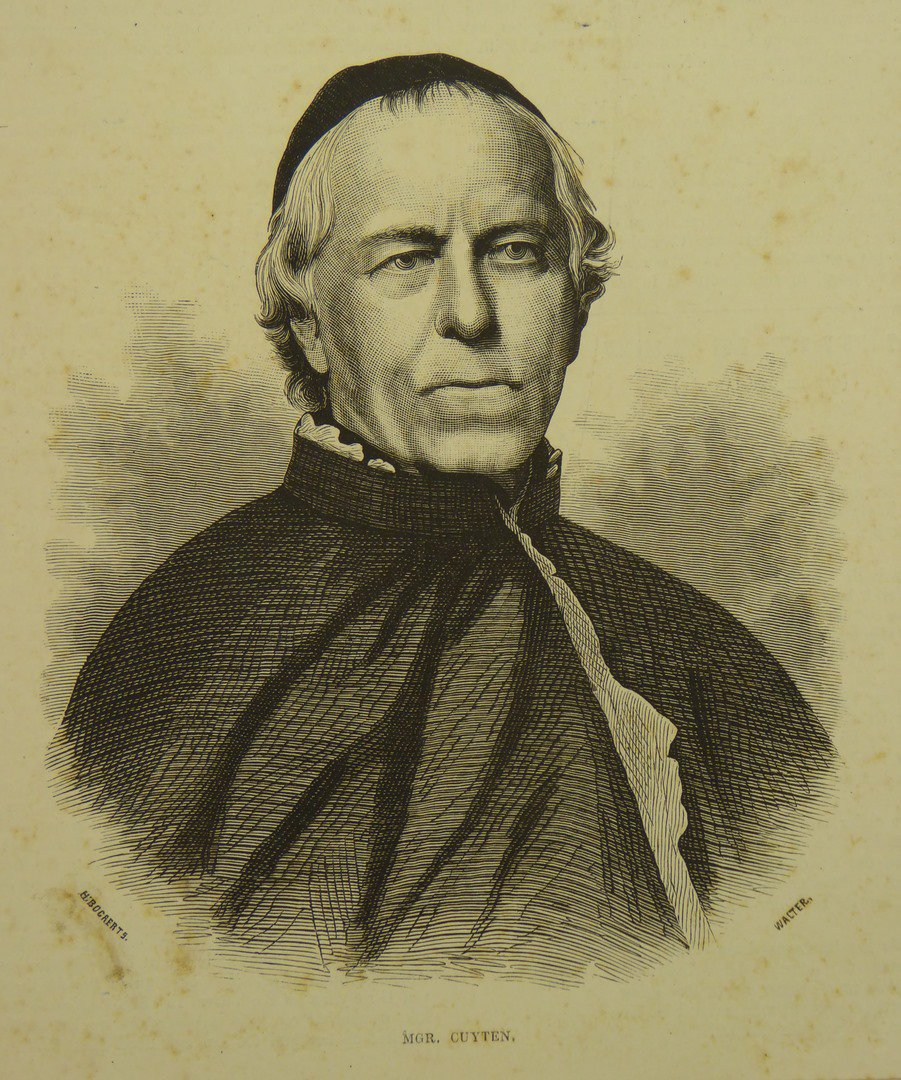
Mgr. Jacobus Cuyten (1799-1884), president seminary

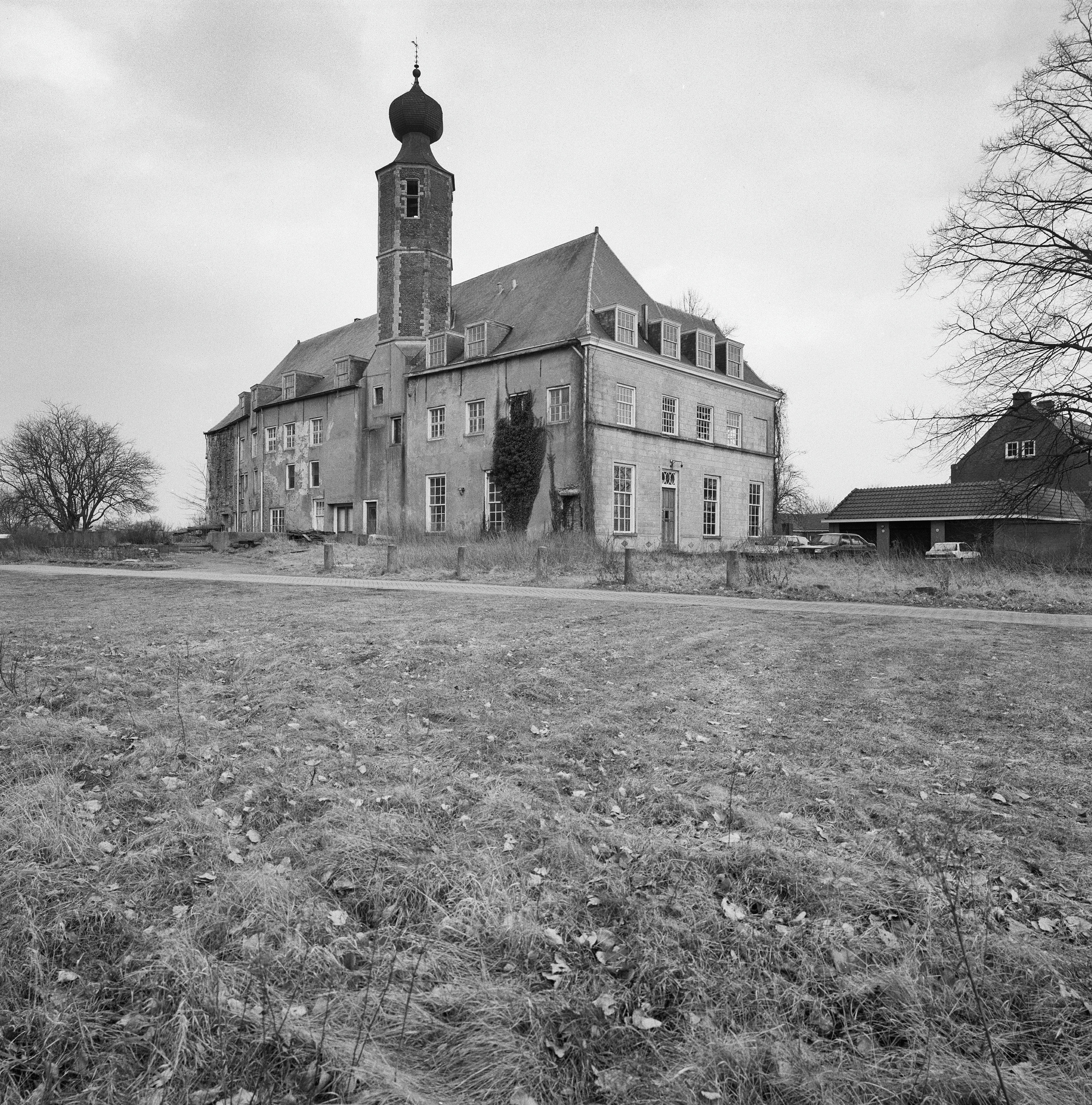
Nieuw-Herlaer in 1997

=== Van Bonstetten ===
In 1789 a Countess Genoveva Maria van Welderen got the Van Honsealer/Van Gerwen half, described as: 'The half in a part of Nieuw-Herlaer Castle, east of the demolished hall. Consisting of a house-above, a chapel, gardener's house, other buildings and courts, gardens and ponds, all of it on loan from Oud Herlaer.' That year she bought the Pybes d'Adema half of the castle, described as: 'An old noble castle in Sint-Michielsgestel, on the west side, with shed, stables, courts, trees, and the big stone gate standing before that castle, as well as the house called 'the brick oven'.

Countess Genoveva Maria van Welderen married Sigismund David baron van Bonstetten. The castle was razed, except for the tower that is still standing. A new country house was built instead. The subsequent Batavian Revolution probably spelled the financial doom of the Bonstetten's. In December 1798 they auctioned the inventory of the manor. In 1798 they sold Nieuw-Herlaer to Thomas Cornelis van Rijckevorsel for 17,000 guilders.

=== Nieuw-Herlaer becomes a Seminary ===
Van Rijckevorsel bought Nieuw-Herlaer on behalf of the seminary which had been founded in 's-Hertogenbosch in January 1798. In 1799 the priests moved in. The seminary started with 32 students but soon became too crowded. In 1806 a building and a chapel were added to Nieuw-Herlaer. In 1816 a new floor was added. In 1839 the seminary was moved to Haaren, near Oisterwijk.

=== Institute for the deaf (1840–1910) ===
On 2 October 1840 Nieuw-Herlaer became the Catholic institute for the deaf-mute Instituut voor Doven. At first it had 40 pupils. Soon it was expanded with classrooms, laundry house, and bakery for sacramental bread. After a new huge building in Sint-Michielsgestel had been completed in 1910, the institute left Nieuw-Herlaer.

=== Nieuw-Herlaer becomes a convent ===
Multiple nunneries then came to the building. In 1911 came the French Benedictine sisters from Jouarre Abbey, fleeing the secularization policy in France. The name of the seminary now changed to Nieuw-Herlaer Abbey. In 1919 the French nuns went back to France, and an Austrian order moved in. In 1921 they housed 50 Hungarian children, and in general, the Austrian nuns were busy in nursing. Later there were religious students from Tilburg. From 1926 to 1954 the Society of African Missionaries from Cadier en Keer was housed at Nieuw-Herlaer.

=== Institute for people with developmental disabilities ===
In 1955 most of the building was bought by the College van Regenten over de Godshuizen en den Algemeenen Armenzorg in 's-Hertogenbosch. This organization used it to house an institute for people with severe developmental disabilities. Later, in 1960, an observation clinic for children's psychiatry and neurology was housed in the buildings. The Austrian nuns continued to be involved in nursing tasks for the patients. In 1970 the institute moved to the new Herlaarhof in Vught.

=== Ownership of Van der Linden ===
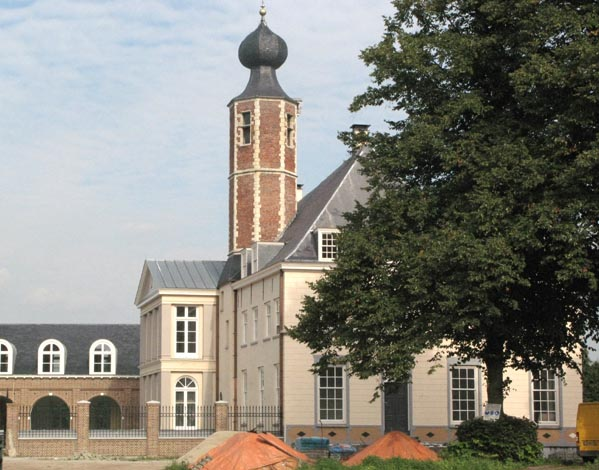
Nieuw-Herlaar in 2008

In 1978 the construction company J.P. van der Linden from Sint-Michielsgestel bought Nieuw-Herlaer for 825,000 guilders. Plans to give Nieuw-Herlaer a commercial purpose failed.

In the late 1980s, Myrke Stalman and Chiel van der Linden managed the castle. In 1992 they bought it and created a castle for children, helped by many local volunteers. The buildings were also used for commercial purposes, but the income from these activities was not enough to preserve the castle.

== Nieuw-Herlaer today ==
In 2006 Cor Pijnenburg bought Nieuw-Herlaer and restored the main building and the convent; the rest of the buildings were demolished. Therefore, the older parts of the current building consist of a 15th-century tower and the annexed late 18th-century building.
