= Speelman =

Speelman or Speelmans is a Dutch occupational surname. A speelman now exclusively means a (historical) musician, but in the past was used for a performing artist with other skills. Notable people with the surname include:

- Cornelis Speelman (1628–1684), Dutch Governor-General of the Dutch East Indies
- Edward Speelman (1910–1994), English art dealer
- Harry Speelman (1916–1994), American football player
- Hermann Speelmans (1906–1960), German stage and film actor
- Jon Speelman (born 1956), English chess player, mathematician and chess writer
- Henny Speelman (born 1991), Belgian data visualization expert and artist
- Speelman baronets, members of the Speelman baronetcy; descendants of Cornelis Speelman
