= Geldrop Castle =

Dutch castle

- Kasteel Geldrop
- Geldrop
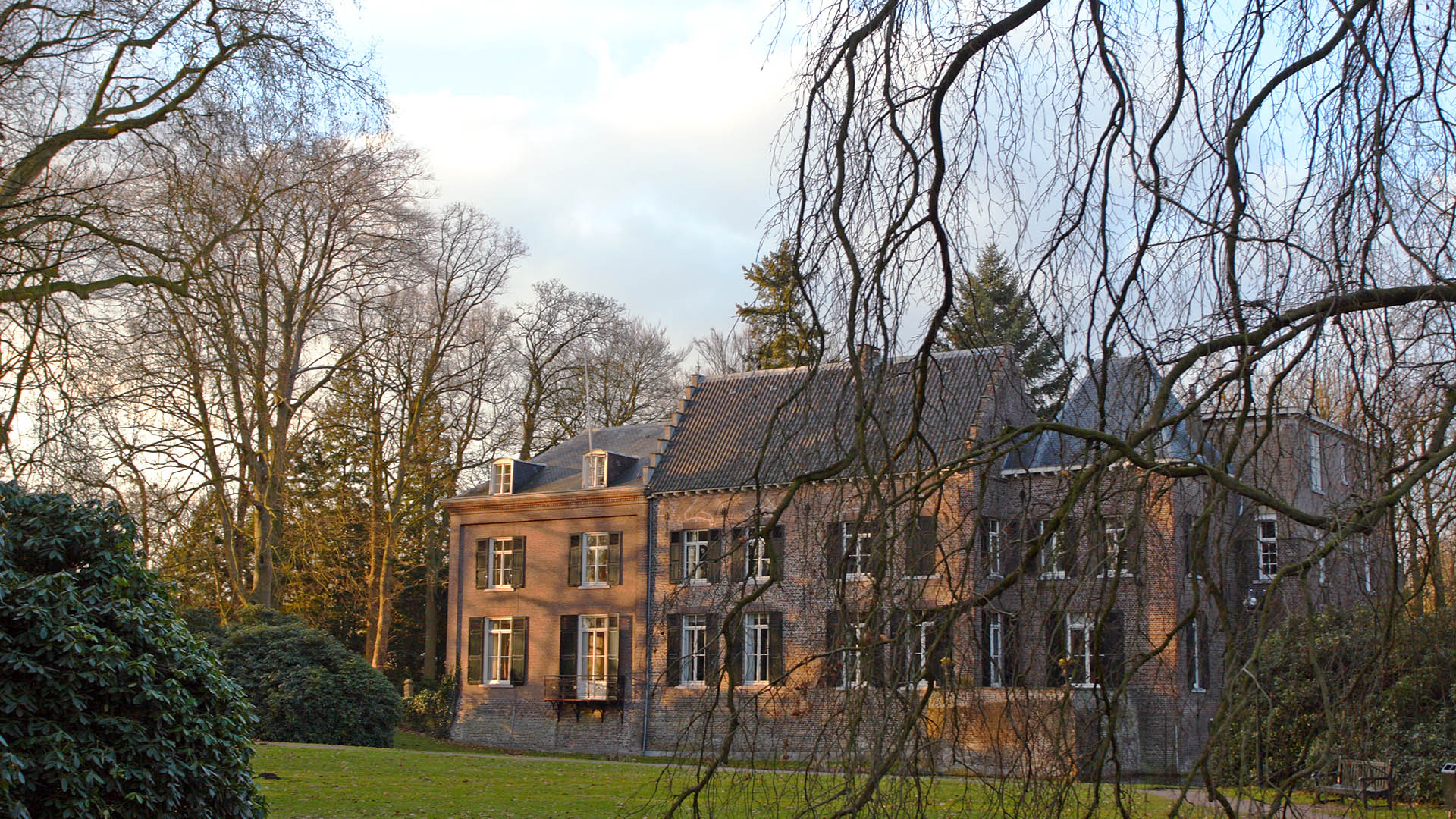
- Geldrop Castle

Site information
- Open to the public: yes, parts

Location
- The Netherlands
- Location within North Brabant
- Coordinates: 51.425100°N 5.559971°E

Geldrop Castle is a castle with park near the center of Geldrop, North-Brabant, the Netherlands. It is on the edge of the valley of the Kleine Dommel.

== History ==
=== Van Geldrop ===
The first known inhabitants were Philip van Geldrop and Jan van Geldrop, who built Geldrop Castle about 1350. They held Geldrop as a loan from Guelders. Jan van Geldrop succeeded his father in 1371. Jan van Geldrop participated in the 1371 Battle of Baesweiler on the Brabant side. In 1395 Jan's son Philip van Geldrop became lord of Geldrop. He was succeeded by his son Rogier van Geldrop in 1403. In 1403 Rogier was succeeded by his younger brother Philip.

Philip van Geldrop continued in power till 1456, and became rather powerful. His daughter Jutta married Aert Daniels van Goor, and he became Philip's heir. On 29 June 1462 the Teutonic Order bought the heerlijkheid (lordship) Geldrop from Aert van Goor and Jutta van Geldrop for 3,000 guilders.

=== Van Horne ===
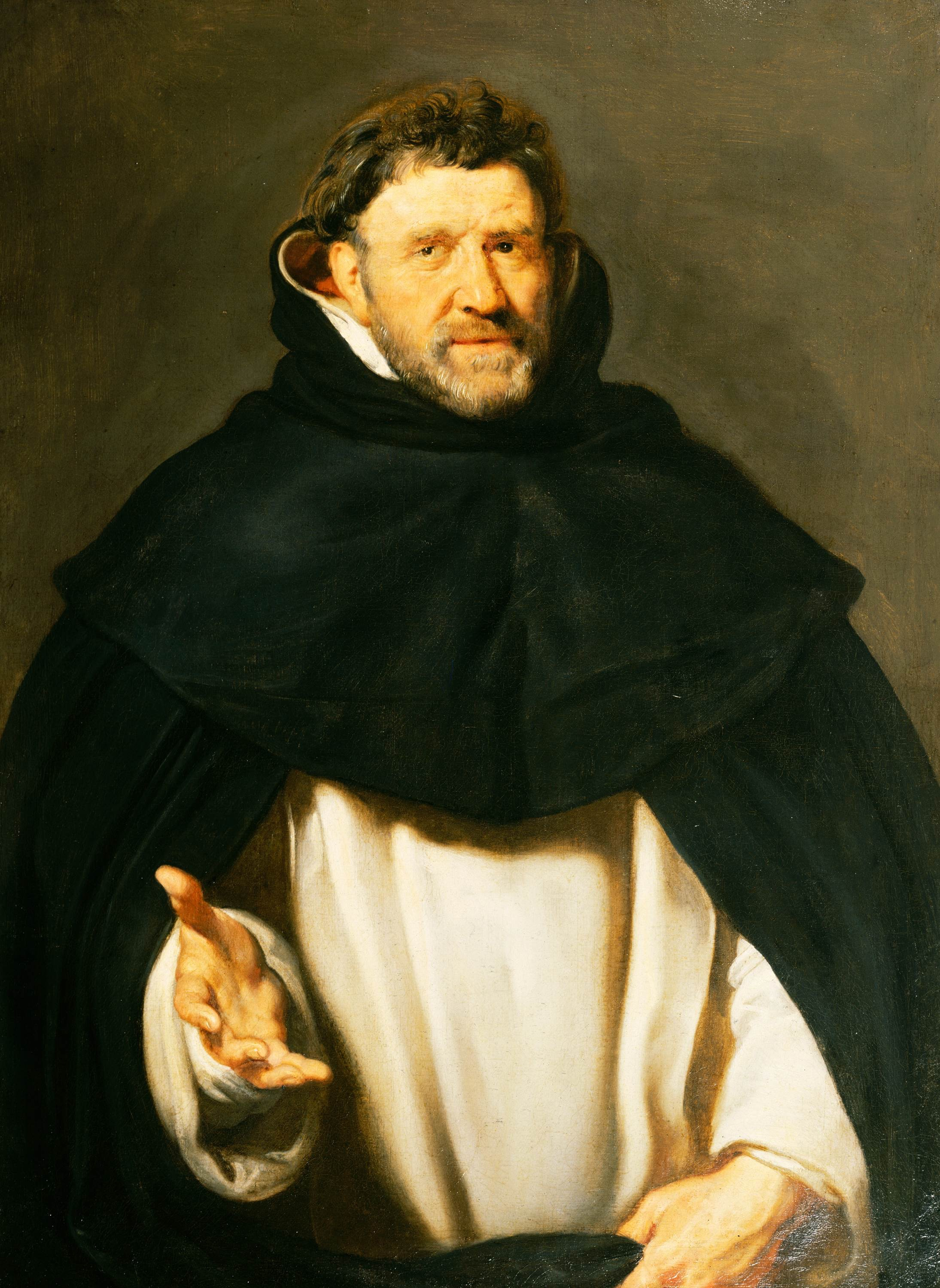
Michael Ophovius

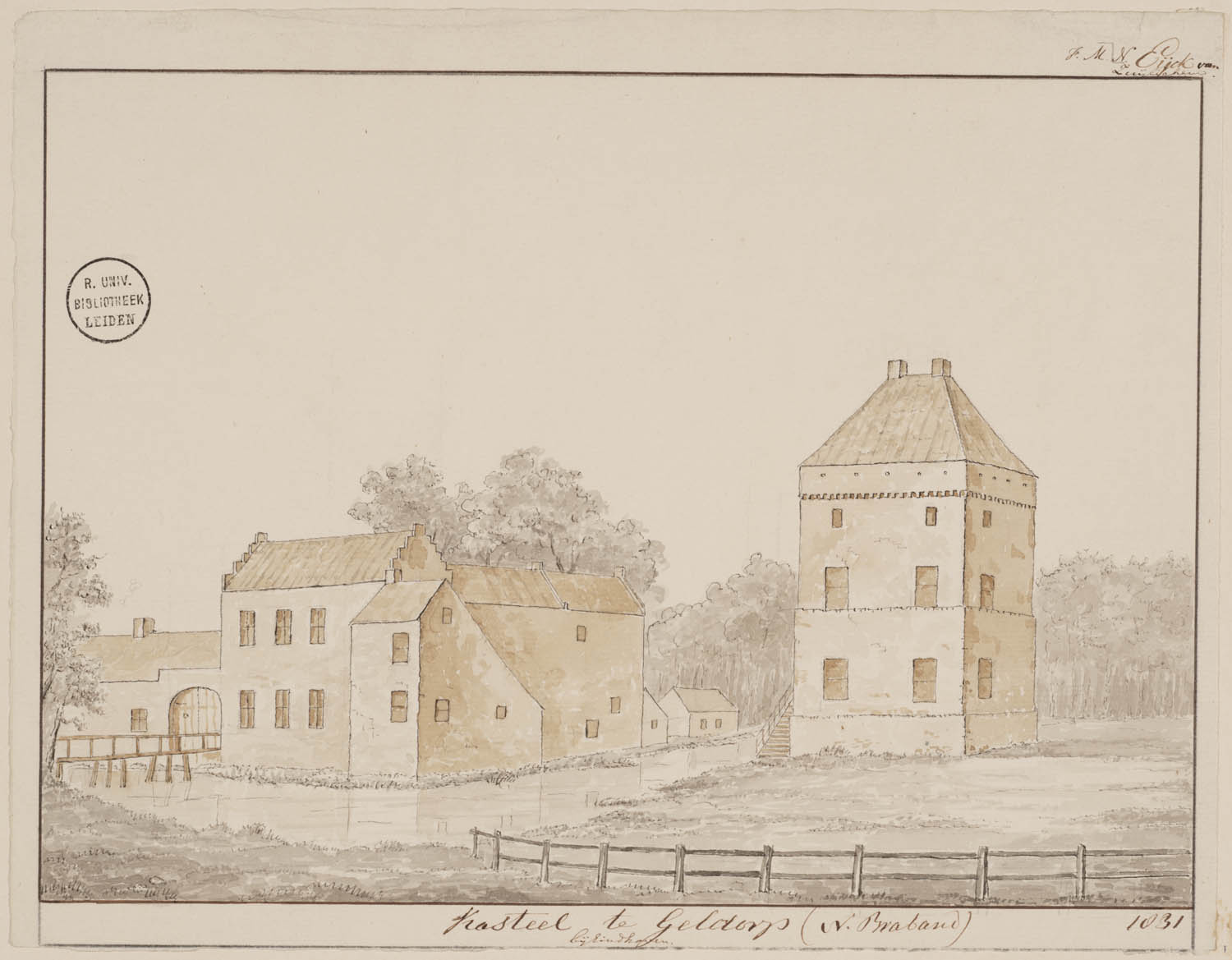
Geldrop Castle in 1831

By an act of the same date of 29 June 1462, Philip van Horne received the Lordship of Geldrop on loan from the Teutonic Order. Claes van der Dussen, commander of Alden Biesen acted on behalf of the order. Philip van Horne belonged to the branch van Gaasbeek-Houtekerke.

For the next two centuries the Van Horne family owned the castle. For them it was a minor possession which they rarely visited. In 1580 Willem van Horne (Guillaume de Hornes Heze) was beheaded for treason in Le Quesnoy. In 1585 Alexander Farnese, governor of the Netherlands gifted the lordship of Geldrop to Maria van Horne sister of Willem. George van Horne, a brother of William, got the lordship of Heeze, Leende en Zesgehuchten.

=== Van Horne Geldrop ===
Maria's half brother Amand I van Horne managed both lordships for their owners. Amand van Horne (?-1617) was a natural son of Martin van Horne and Catherine de Hornes. In 1609 he was legitimized, and authorized to hold the Lordship of Geldrop. Amandus I lived at Geldrop. At the time the keep still stood. In 1616 Amandus renovated the outer bailey, creating the core of the current castle. The central part is the high house with stepped gables marked with anchor plates depicting the year 1616. During the Eighty Years' War (1568-1648) Amandus I van Horne fought on the royalist side. He married Barbara de Jeude de Chastillon (?-1620).

Amand II (?-1650), their third son became the next of Lord of Geldrop. He rose to a high rank in the Spanish Netherlands army. In 1615 he married Isabella della Faille (?-1648). For Geldrop Castle, the 1629 fall of 's-Hertogenbosch meant that it came into the front line. Its Bishop Michael Ophovius took refuge at Geldrop Castle for two years. During these years Peter Paul Rubens visited Geldrop Castle several times. Rubens was a good friend of Ophovius and made several portraits of the fugitive bishop.

Amand III (1617-1672) was the oldest son of Amand II. He became a priest. He was succeeded as lord of Geldrop by his brother Martin Ignatius van Horne (1619-1691). Martin did not live at Geldrop, and when the family visited, they stayed on the keep. The outer bailey was generally used by the clergy, and served as a cereal storage. A clandestine church was situated on the castle grounds.

=== O'Donnoghue ===
In 1716 John O’Donnoghue became Lord of Geldrop. He was succeeded by Jan Robert Joseph O'Donnoghue, who decided to sell the lordship in 1768.

=== Van Sprangh ===
In 1768 Adriaan van Sprangh from Leiden bought the castle for 29,000 guilders. He would become the first Protestant Lord of Geldrop. At the time, the castle was uninhabitable, e.g. the keep did not have a roof. In 1770 the renovation of the castle was tendered for 1,400 guilders. Van Sprangh did not enjoy his castle for long, because he died in 1772. His coat of arms is in the western façade of the castle.

The castle was inherited by Catharina Petronella Nobel, wife of Paulus Eckringa (?- 1791). Their daughter Wilhelmina Johanna Eckringa van Sprangh became the next and final lady of Geldrop, but she never lived on the castle. After the French invasion of the Netherlands, the feudal rights were cancelled in 1795. With less income, the castle went into sharp decline. In 1806 the inventory was sold. In 1807 and 1809 the castle grounds were rented out to the emerging local textiles industry. The grounds were used to place the frames on which cloth was spanned after fulling.

=== Hoevenaar ===
In 1828 Sara Hoevenaar (?-1843) inherited the castle. She offered the keep for break up in 1838. In 1840 it was demolished. Sara's nephew Hubertus Paulus Hoevenaar inherited the castle. He made a fortune with sugar production in the Dutch East Indies. He also created the Eindhoven tree farm and was one of the biggest shareholders of the Eindhoven precursor of the Rabobank.

In about 1878 the castle is rigorously changed by Hubertus Paulus Hoevenaar. On the western side the drawbridge and gatehouse were demolished, and a new wing was added. This is the current marriage room. East of the 1616 building, a part was demolished in order to create the current terrace. He had a stone plaque with his arms placed in the northern façade. Hubertus Paulus Hoevenaar created the English landscape garden at the castle.

=== Van Tuyll van Serooskerken ===
In 1905 Arnaudina Hoevenaar inherited Geldrop. In 1881 she had married mr. Hendrik Nicolaas Cornelis baron van Tuyll van Serooskerken, mayor of Voorburg. In 1912 they went to live at Geldrop Castle. In 1914 the current wedding room was home to fugitives from Belgium. In 1924 Jan Maximiliaan (1886-1938) became the next owner of Geldrop Castle. He married Carolina Frederika Henriëtte Quarles van Ufford. In 1912 the couple built House Kampzicht. In 1934 it moved to the castle. Mrs. Van Tuyll van Serooskerken-Quarles van Ufford died in 1972.

=== Municipality and foundation ===
In 1974 Geldrop castle was sold to the municipality of Geldrop. The castle got a municipal Oudheidkamer, a collection of local antiquities. The wedding room became an official venue for weddings in the municipality of Geldrop. It was also used for small concertos, and it became possible to hire rooms for meetings at the castle.

On 30 December 1996 Stichting Landgoed Kasteel Geldrop (a foundation) became owner of Geldrop Castle and its park.

== Castle ==
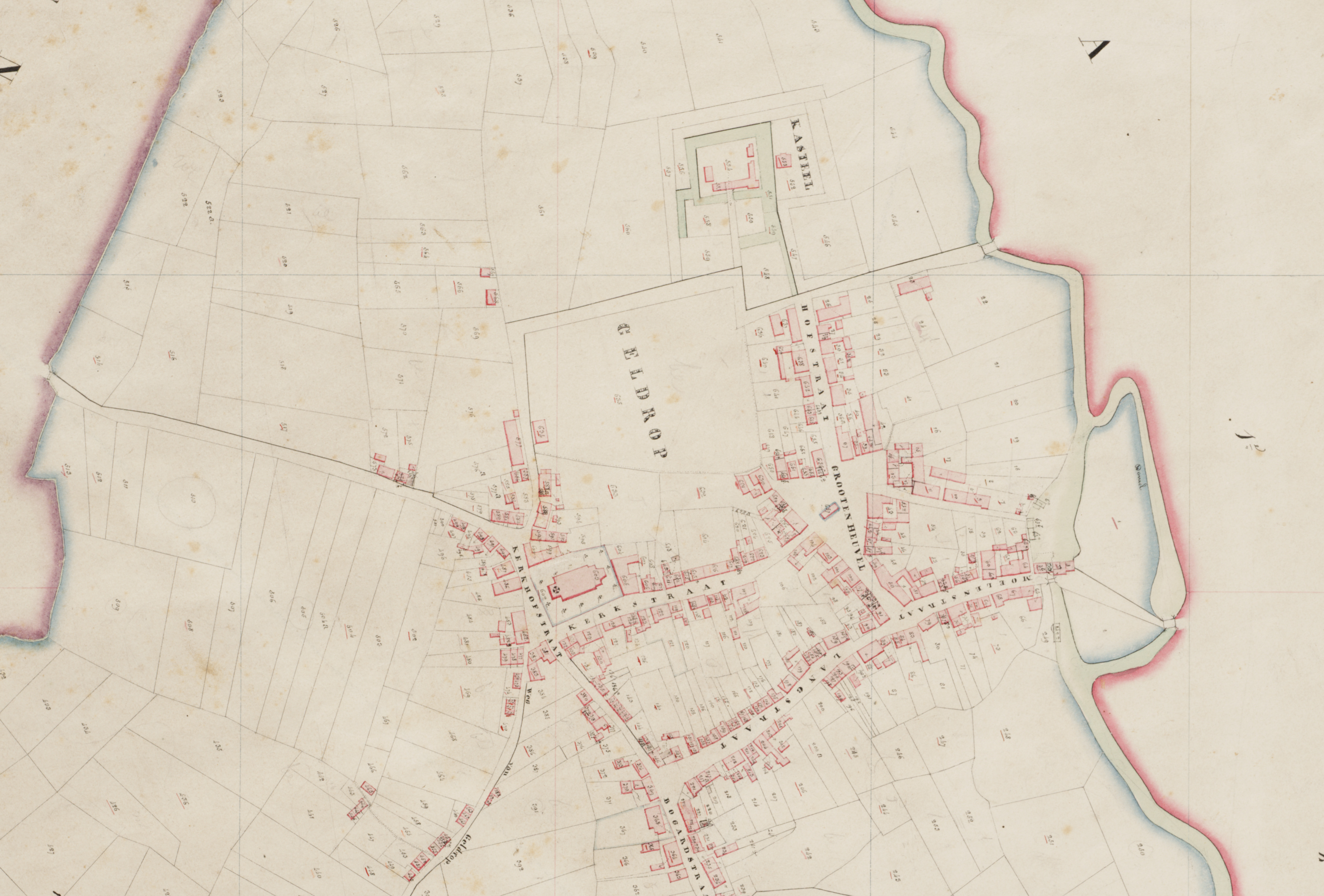
Geldrop Castle with the keep on a 1811-1832 map.

The first construction of the castle is generally dated to 1350. The later ground plan could allow for an earlier motte-and-bailey castle, but archaeological excavations did not find remains from before the 14th century, making a motte very unlikely.

The keep was the defendable medieval castle. For the outer bailey the defendable character is less clear. The old castle was destroyed in 1512, but the keep could obviously be repaired. The end of the keep came in 1839, when it was demolished.

The keep had an aboveground basement and three floors, making 5 levels. The size was c. 12.5 m by 10 m as deduced from the 1811-1832 cadastre map. The ceiling of each floor was supported by 13 beams of 33 Helmond feet (28.7 cm) long, or 9.47 m. In 1996 a group of amateur archaeologists from the local history society performed a preliminary investigation, and investigated the surrounding grounds by drilling holes. They found the location of the keep and its moat. They also found that a large section of wall had collapsed to the inside, and was still present. D.B.M. Hermans made a reconstruction of the medieval castle in 2013.

The current castle has been built on the outer bailey of the old castle. The high central building dates from 1616. The 19th century renovation by Hubertus Paulus Hoevenaar probably saved the castle, but also did a lot damage. He demolished a tower-like annex on the south-eastern side of the 1616 core in order to create a terrace. He also built the wedding room at the place of the former gatehouse. Because all windows now have more or less the same size, these probably also date from the same renovation. The top floor of the eastern wing of the current castle is 20th century.

== Park ==
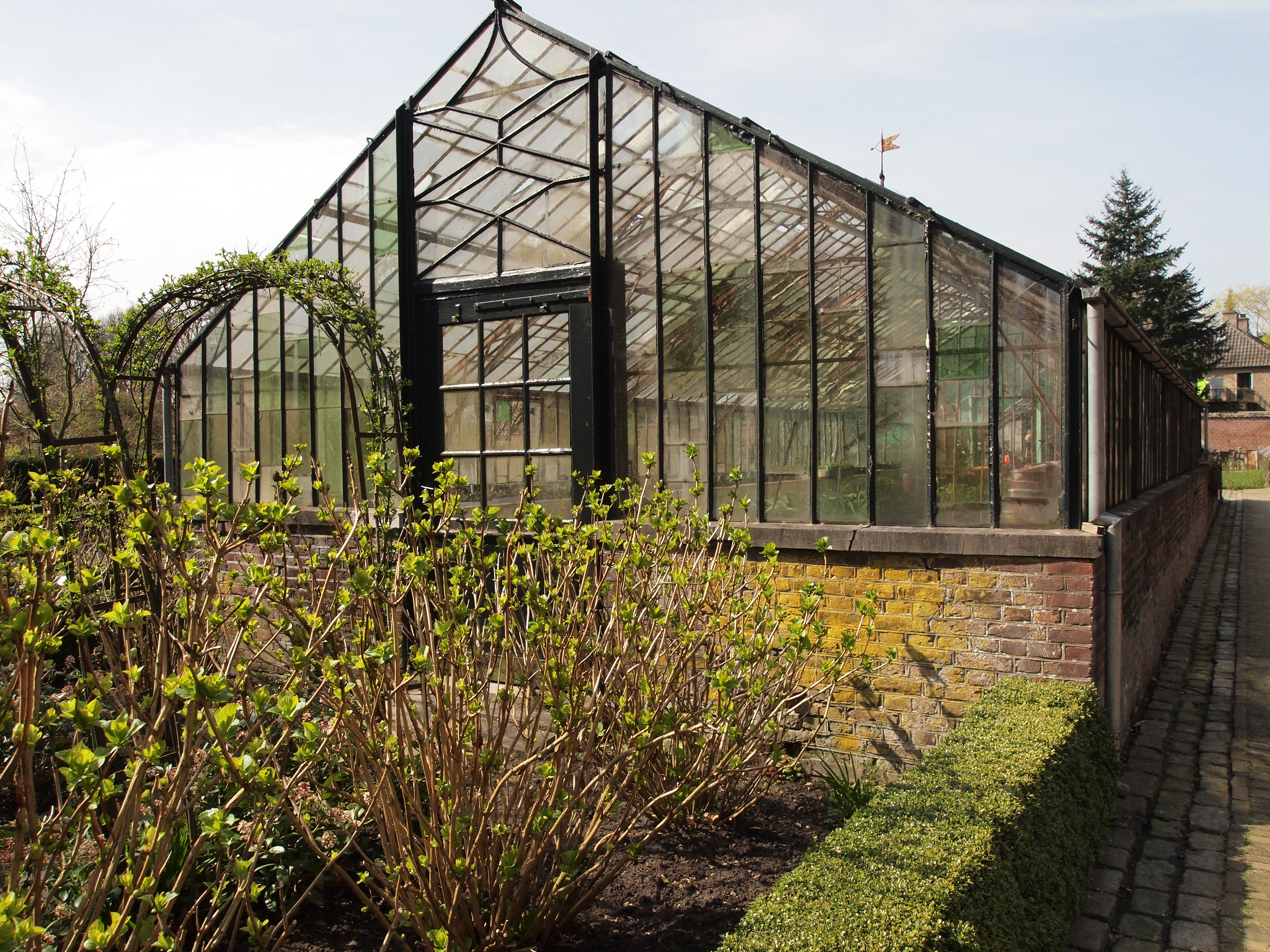
greenhouse c. 1870

In about 1866 the English landscape garden of 11 hectares was created around the castle. Creator Hubertus Paulus Hoevenaar had a special interest in trees. As was normal for this type of garden, it contains exotic species in some places. One of these is a giant sequoia of now 38 m high. The exotic Oriental plane belongs to an 18-piece platanaceae collection, the only one in the Netherlands. The park had a famous large European beech of the pendula variant. This beech died during a 2016 flooding of the Kleine Dommel, which kind of fits with the history of the castle.

In 1990 the terrain adjacent to the northern side of the park was rearranged. This used to be a poplar forest of little ecological value. It was thinned out, and made less approachable to humans by bushes and blackberries. The park and adjacent grounds are now home to the tawny owl, kingfisher, sparrowhawk, and multiple kinds of woodpeckers. The terrains are connected to the Collse Zeggen, and therefore foxes and roe often visit.

The castle garden is surrounded by a monumental wall. It contains a monumental orangery and two greenhouses from 1870. Other monuments on the castle grounds are the house of the land agent, called rentmeester, and the generator house. The latter contained an engine-generator that gave the castle its own power-supply.
