= Van Boetzelaer =

van Boetzelaer
- noble family
- Country: Netherlands; Germany
- Founded: 13th century
- Titles: baron

Van Boetzelaer (or: van den Boetzelaer) is an old aristocratic family that stems from the region of Kalkar, Germany.

== History ==
The family history in the Duchy of Cleves can be traced back to the 13th century ("Uradel"), when the van Boetzelaers belonged to the local nobility. A castle Boetzelaer in Kalkar was rebuilt from its ruins after WWII. In the sixteenth century, the family settled in The Netherlands. Nowadays, the family belongs to the Dutch nobility. Members carry the title of baron.

== Coat of arms ==
Based on the similarity of their coat of arms, it is likely that the van Boetzelaer family are related to the Wesphalian von Galen family. The Boetzelaer coat of arms is depicted in the medieval Gelre Armorial (folio 93r).

== Famous scions ==
- Pim van Boetzelaer van Oosterhout (1892–1986), Dutch Minister of Foreign Affairs.

== Gallery ==
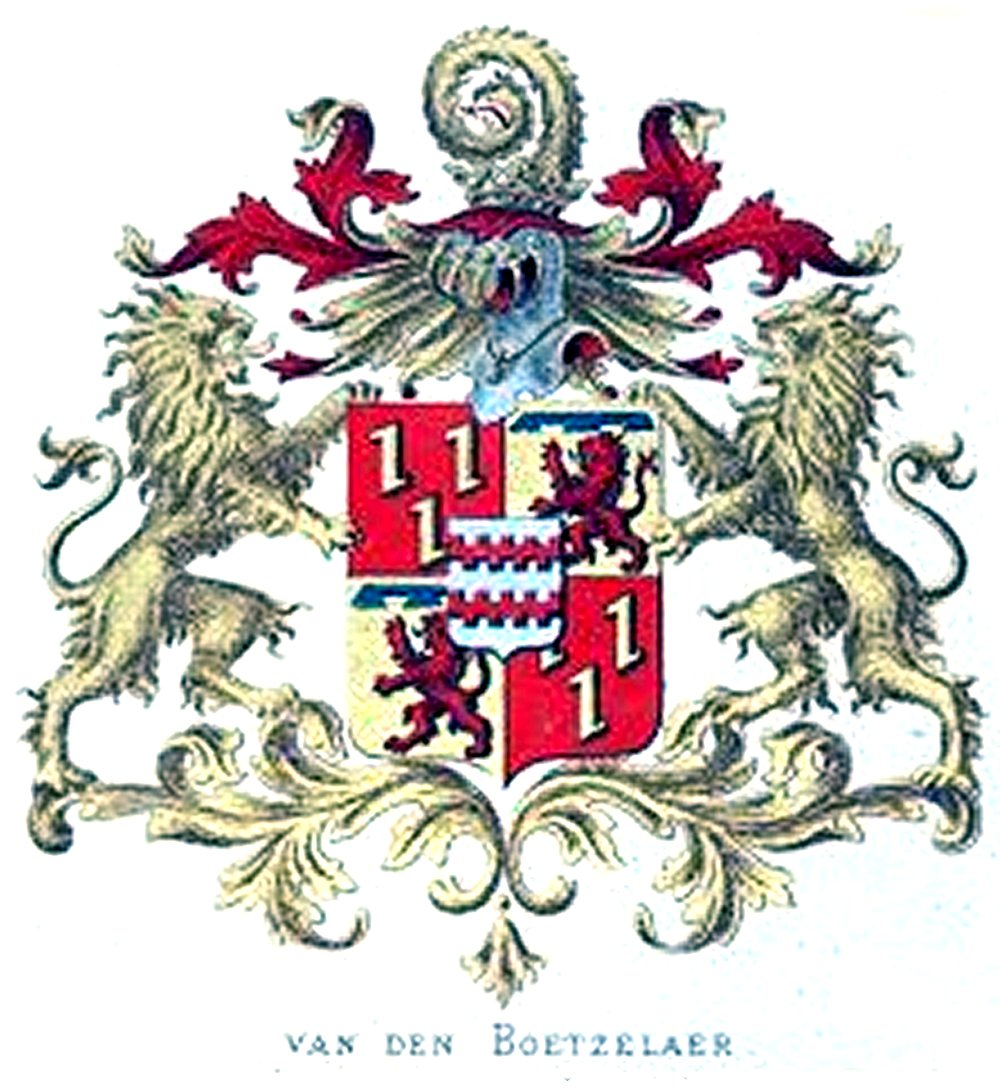
Coat of arms

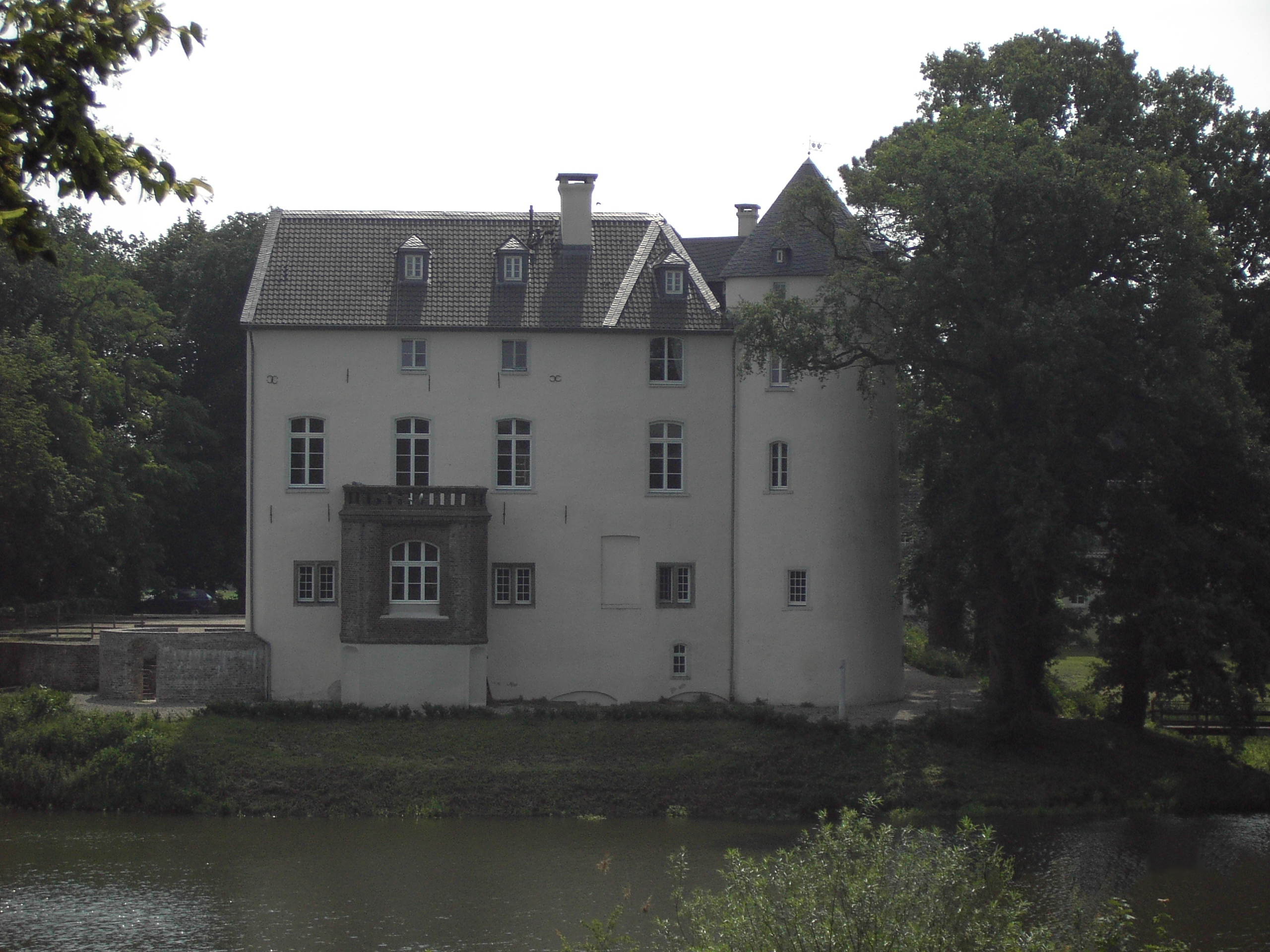
Haus Boetzelaer near Kalkar

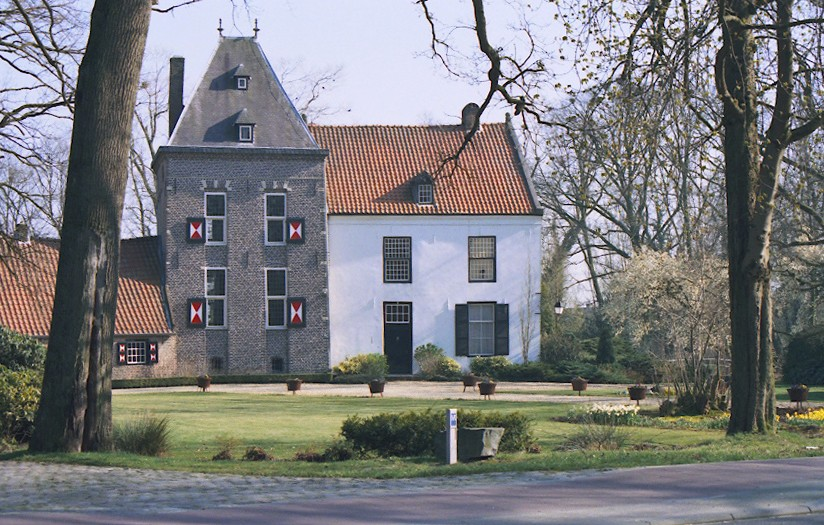
Castle Deurne

== Literature ==
- Polak-de Booy, E.P., Inventaris archieven van Boetzelaer, Utrecht, 1965
- des Tombe J.W., bewerkt door C.W.L. baron van Boetzelaer, Het geslacht van den Boetzelaer. De historische ontwikkeling van de rechtspositie en de staatkundige invloed van een belangrijk riddermatig geslacht, Assen, 1969
- Kruimel, H.L., Inventaris van de genealogische bescheiden nagelaten door C.W.L. Baron van Boetzelaer, 's-Gravenhage, 1978
- Polak-de Booy, E.P., Inventaris van de archieven van de familie van Boetzelaer 1316–1952, Inventarisreeks van het Rijksarchief Utrecht, 32, Rijksarchief Utrecht, Utrecht, 1982
