= County of Horne =

Historic county of the Holy Roman Empire

County of Horne Graofsjap Häör (Limburgish) Graafschap Horn (Dutch)
- 920–1795
- Coat of arms

- Lordship of Horne (1350)
- Status: County
- Capital: Horn
- Common languages: Limburgish, Dutch
- Religion: Roman Catholicism
- Historical era: Middle Ages
  - Established: 920
  - Personal union: 1568
  - Annexed by France: 1795
  - Concordat: 10 September 1801
Preceded by	Succeeded by
Maasgau	Meuse-Inférieure; French First Republic

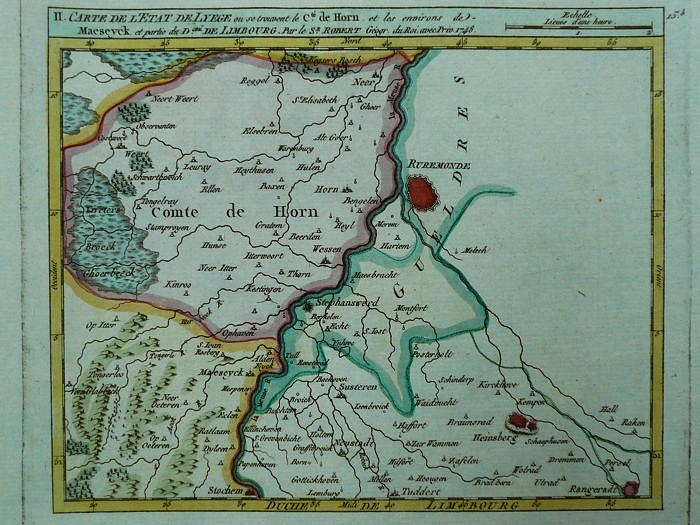
The County of Horn in the 18th century

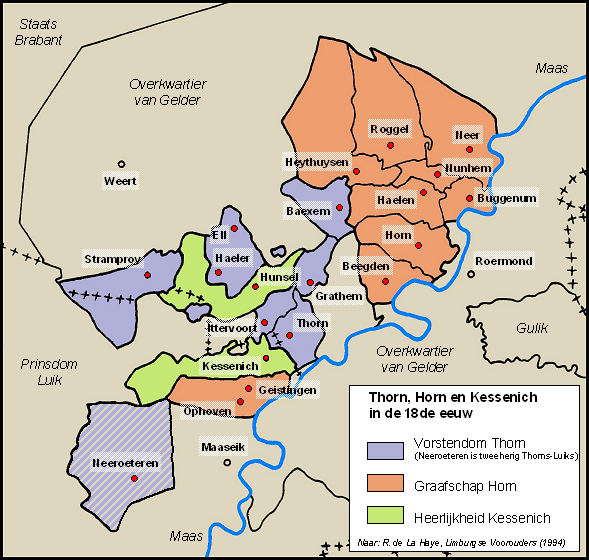
Map showing the Imperial Abbey of Thorn, the County of Horne and the barony of Kessenich

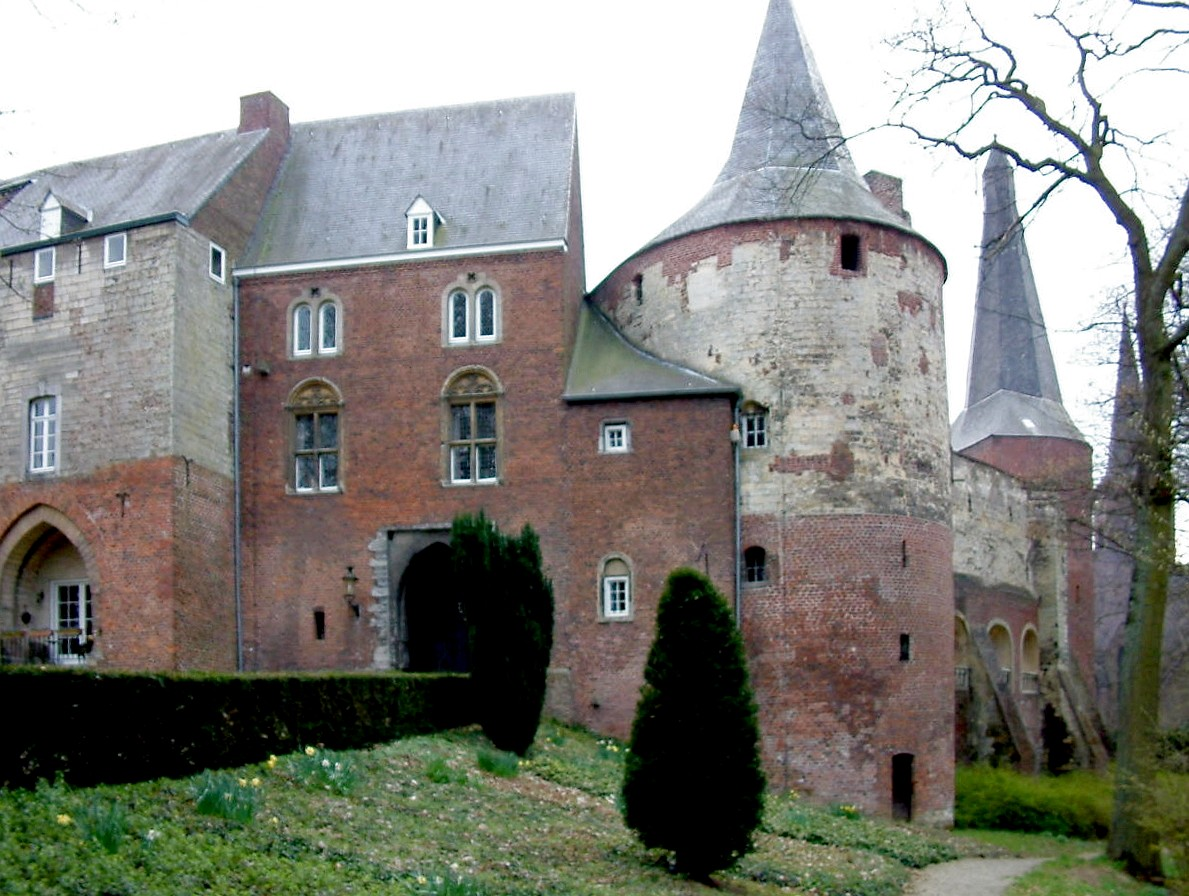
Castle Horn

Horne (also Horn, Hoorn or Hoorne) is a small historic county of the Holy Roman Empire in the present-day Netherlands and Belgium. It takes its name from the village Horn, west of Roermond. The residence of the counts of Horne was moved from Horn to Weert in the 15th century.

After the execution in 1568 of Philip de Montmorency who died without male heirs, the Prince-Bishop of Liège, as suzerain of Horne, was declared the direct lord and new count. The bishops ruled the county in personal union. Horne maintained its own laws and customs as well as its financial autonomy. The county included the communes of Neer, Nunhem, Haelen, Buggenum, Roggel, Heythuysen, Horne, Beegden, Geystingen and Ophoven.

It was suppressed in 1795, when it was occupied by the French, and it became part of the French département Meuse-Inférieure.

== Rulers of Horne ==
=== Lords of Horne ===
- Engelbert de Hurne,
- Engelbert de Hurnen,
- Henry van Horn, † 1196
- William,
- Engelbert,
- Gerhard van Horn
- William I., † 1264/65,
- Engelbert van Horn, 1212/64
- William II., † 1300/1301,
- William III., † 1301,
- Gerhard I., † 1330,
- Willem IV of Horne (Lord 1330–1343)
- Gerard II of Horne (Lord 1343–1345)
- Willem V of Horne (Lord 1345–1357)
- Dirk Loef of Horne (Lord 1357–1368)
- Willem VI of Horne (Lord 1368–1405) † 1417,
- William VII., † 1433,

=== Counts of Horne ===
- Jacob I., † 1488,
- Jacob II., † 1530,
- Jacob III., X 1531,
- John, † 1540
- Philippe de Montmorency
- The prince-bishops of Liège, 1568–1795

== Sources ==
- Detlev Schwennicke, Europäische Stammtafeln Band XVIII (1998) Tafel 62ff und Band XIV (1991) Tafel 122
