= Dirk Loef of Horne =

- Lord of Horne (1357-1368)
- Arms of Horne
- Predecessor: Willem V of Horne
- Successor: Willem VI of Horne
- Born: c. 1338
- Died: c. 1402
- Mother: Elisabeth of Kleve-Hülchrath

Dirk Loef of Horne was a medieval nobleman from the Holy Roman Empire.

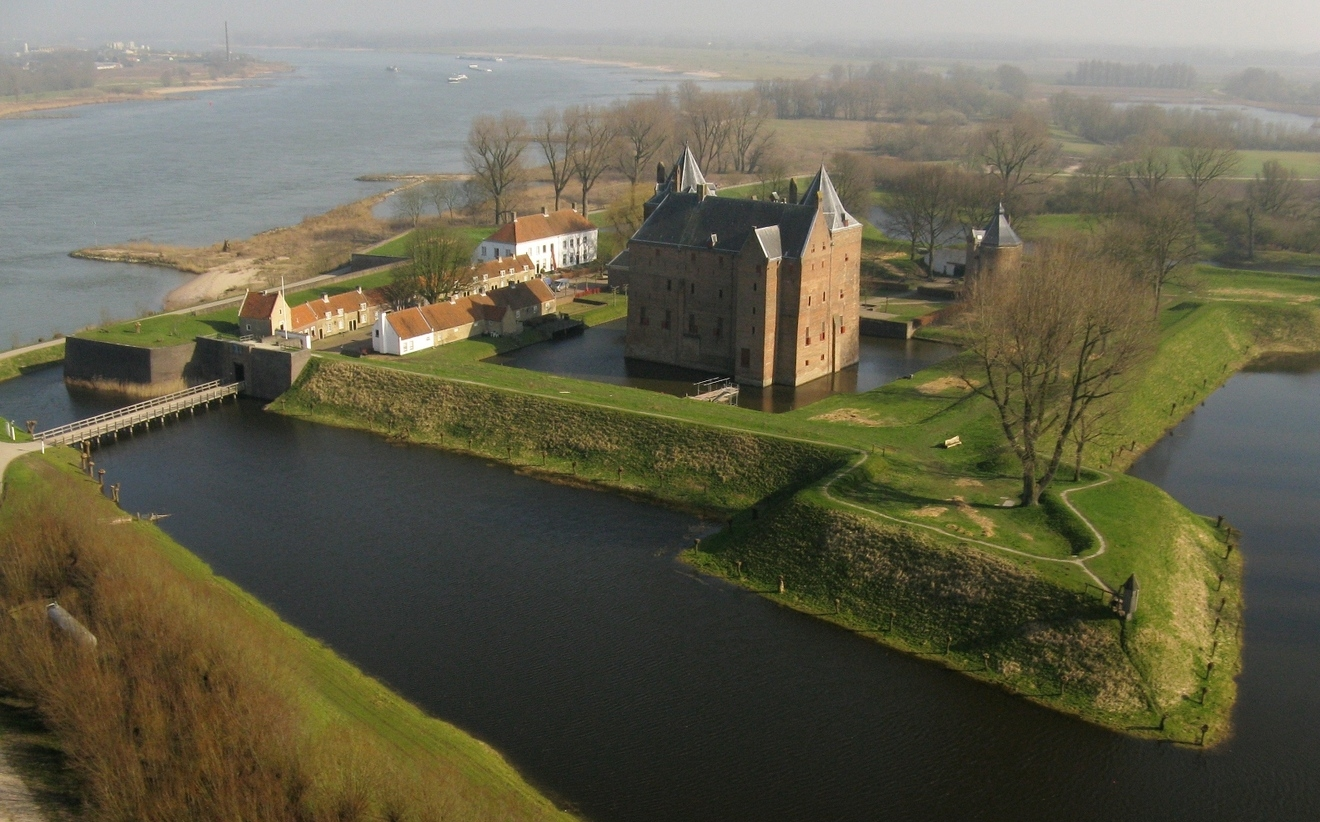
Dirk Loef preserved his name by constructing Loevestein Castle

== Family ==
Dirk Loef van Horne was born in 1338 or 1339. He was the second son of Willem IV of Horne's marriage to Elisabeth of Kleve-Hülchrath, which was his second marriage. This made Dirk Loef's chances to become Lord of Horne very minimal.

Dirk Loef van Horne was called 'Dirk Loef', because he had an uncle called Dirk van Horne (1320-?), son of Gerard I of Horne. 'Loef' was a name popular with the Lords of Kleve. Uncle Dirk van Horne would succeed in becoming Lord of Perwez, and is therefore also known as Dirk of Perwez. Dirk of Perwez would try to help the sons of Willem IV of Horne's second marriage to claim their part of the inheritance of Gerard II of Horne.

== Early years ==
Dirk Loef was first mentioned on 1 September 1344. On that date John III, Duke of Brabant gave the children of Willem IV's second marriage: Willem (V), Dirk Loef, Arnold and Elisabeth, a heath and some other lands near Heeze. This was later known as the Vrije Grond Heerlijkheid Heeze.

=== Marriage ===
Dirk Loef is said to have married Elisabeth of Montigny, Lady of Kasteelbrakel and Hoog-Itter in 1350, but that date is far from certain.

=== Building an estate ===
In about 1354 Dirk Loef succeeded in recovering Bancigny with the support of Dirk of Perwez. At about the same time, they failed to recover Montcornet, which remained under the control of Gijsbrecht of Abcoude. After the death of Jan III of Brabant on 5 December 1355, Dirk of Perwez became one of the main counsellors of the Dukes of Brabant.

== Becomes Lord of Horne etc. ==
=== Succession at Altena ===
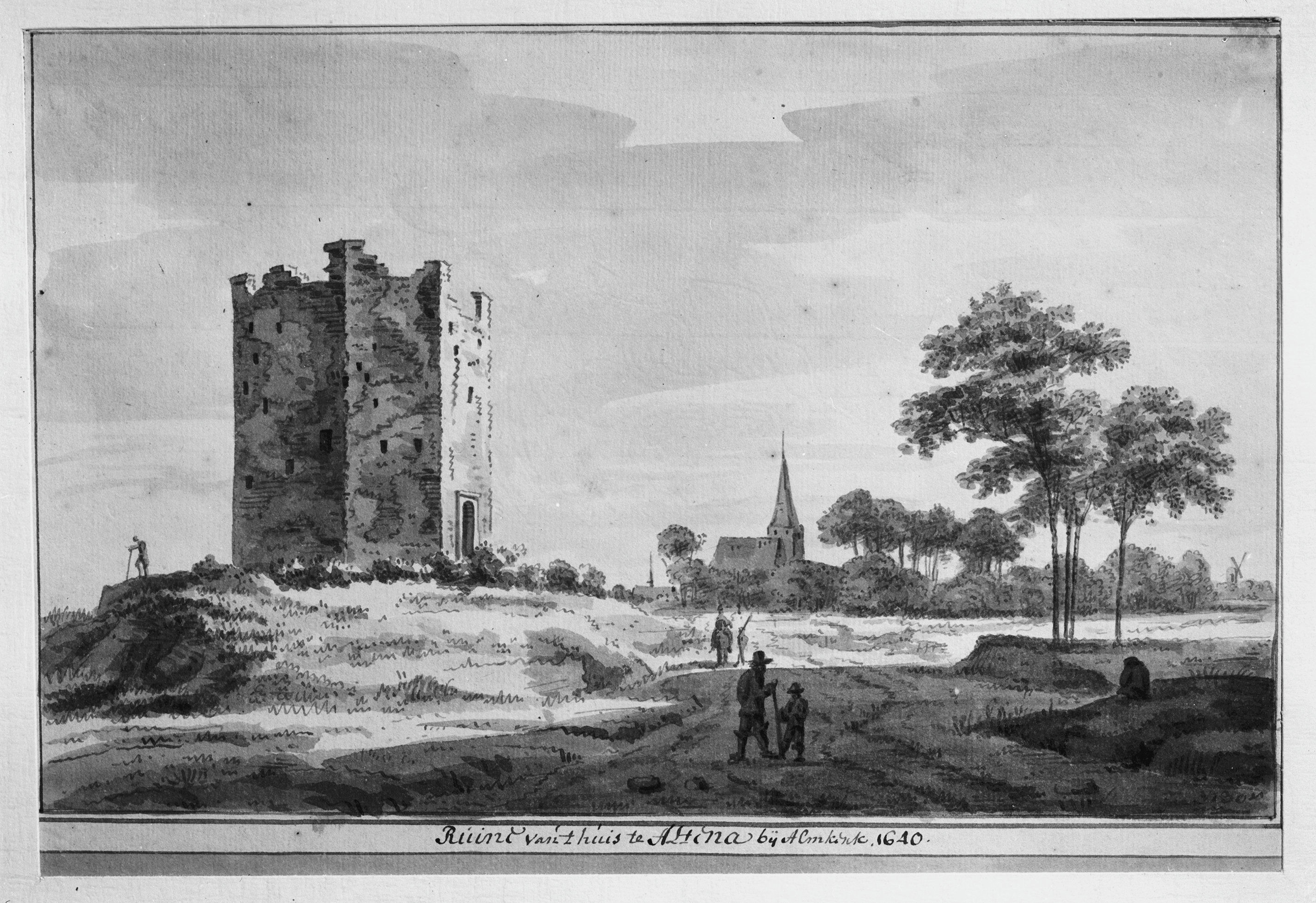
Altena Castle in 1640

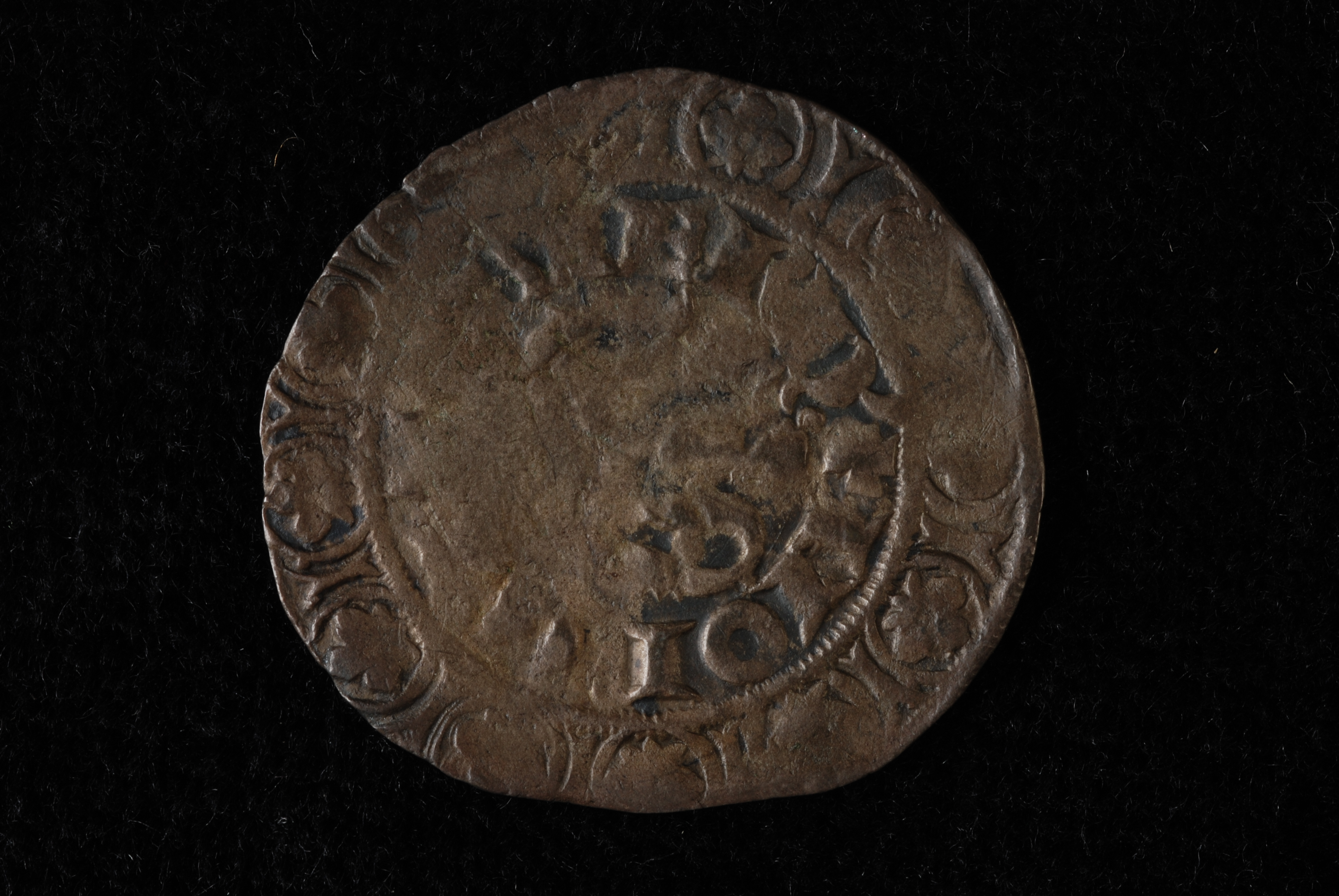
Coin struck at Weert by Dirk Loef

On 3 April 1357 Count William V of Holland granted the land of Altena to Dirk Loef. It is not clear whether his predecessor Willem V of Horne was still alive at that date, or that he died shortly after. Willem V's son was probably not born yet. As the fief could only be inherited from father to son, the count had to agree to a succession by Dirk Loef, whether Willems' son was alive or not. Dirk Loef did help the count in the war against Utrecht, so the count probably liked him better than his predecessor. This was important, because Altena Castle was quite strong.

Dirk Loef still had to pay 4,000 Bruges shields to the count for his succession in Altena. In raising this sum Dirk Loef was helped by his uncle Dirk van Horne then known as Dirk of Perwez. The payment suggests that Dirk Loef became Lord of Altena in his own right. The later succession by Willem VI of Horne, son of Willem V, suggest that Dirk Loef was only a guardian. However, it was not until 1368 that Dirk Loef referred to himself as guardian of Altena instead of as Lord.

The theory that the Count of Holland took the Lordship of Altena back from Willem V in order to give it to Dirk Loef is quite old. It is based on the supposition that Willem V of Horne was still alive on 3 April 1357. However, there is little evidence for this theory.

One of Dirk Loef's first acts as Lord of Altena was to grant part of the fief Nederhemert to knight Peter van Hemert on 25 November 1357.

=== Succession in Guelders, Loon, Jülich ===
The succession of Willem V by Dirk Loef in his Guelders, Loon and Jülich estate seems to have been without incident.

=== Succession in Brabant ===
The succession of Willem V of Horne to Gerard II's possessions in Brabant had been severely contested. Dirk Loef wanted to get a bigger share than Willem V had got, and had the means to get it. It led to arbitration between Dirk Loef and Gijsbrecht of Abcoude by Dirk of Perwez and Jan II van Polanen.

The arbiters ruled that Dirk Loef was to have Horne, Altena, Munnikenland, Herstal, Heeze, Leende, Montcornet and Kortessem. Zweder of Abcoude would only get Gaasbeek and Loon op Zand. Jan III of Polanen and Oda van Horne would get 625 gold hallingen a year out of Herstal from Dirk Loef.

== After the succession ==
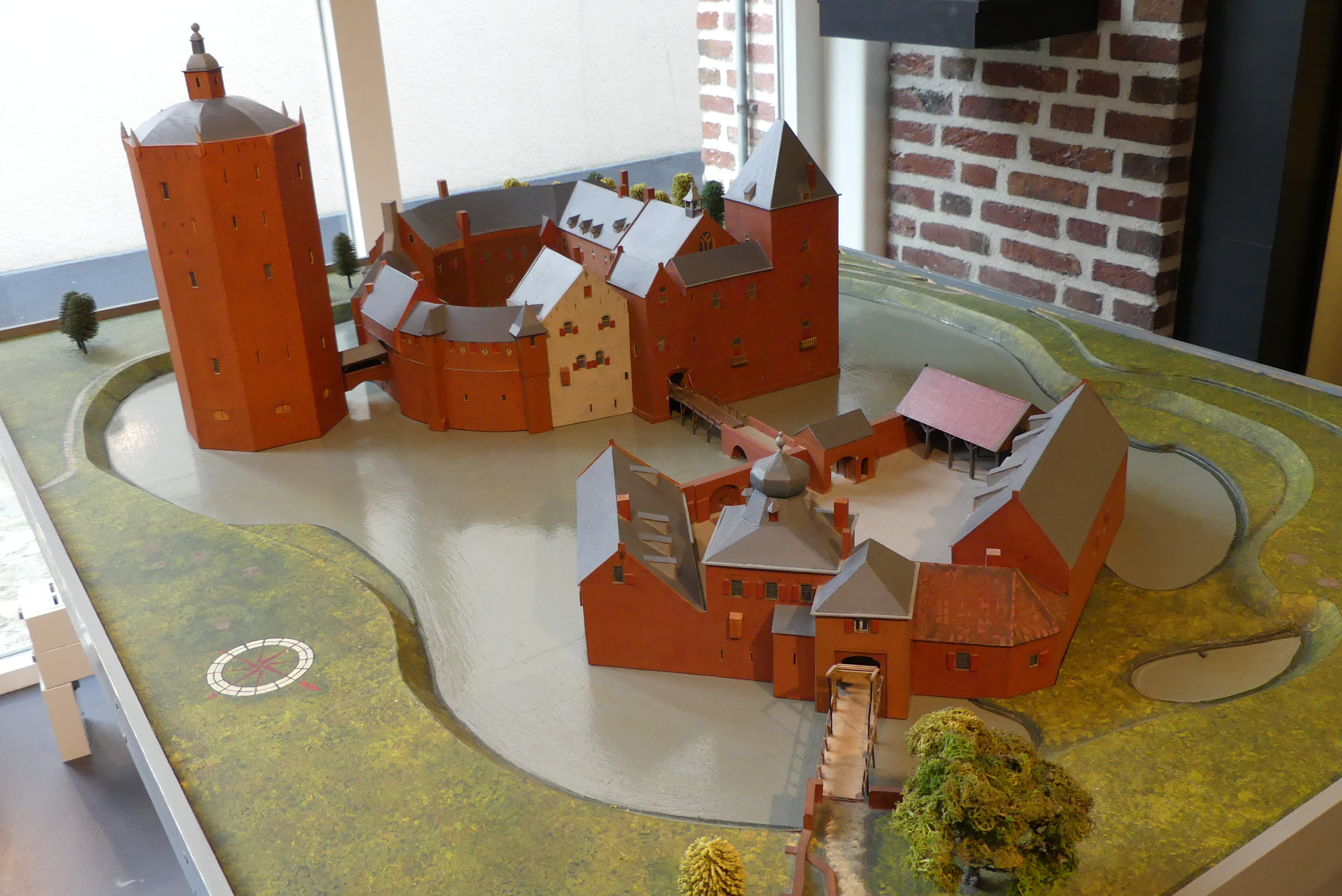
Heusden Castle

Dirk Loef seems to have been on good terms with Diederik of Heinsberg, Count of Loon. In March 1358 Dirk Loef helped the count against the citizens of Maaseik. He was also on a good footing with Albert of Bavaria, regent in Holland from 1358.

=== Hook and Cod Wars ===
One can assume that Dirk Loef aided Count Albert against the Cod castellan Floris van Borselen in the 1358-1359 Siege of Heusden. Dirk Loef was present at a meeting shortly before the siege started. On 19 September 1358 he got freedom of toll in Holland for Woudrichem until further notice. On 12 October 1358 he was ordered to send 30 archers to Heusden, which surrendered in late January 1359.

In April 1359 war broke out between Count Albert and the Cod Lords Jan van Arkel and the Lord of Culemborg. After some serious delays Dirk Loef joined this conflict. He was also summoned to join the siege of Delft (11 March - 29 May 1359), which had sided with the Cod party, but might not have arrived in time.

=== Loevestein Castle ===
In October 1361 Middelburg revolted against Albert of Bavaria. Dirk Loef probably did not help his count in this conflict. A week after the surrender Albert sent a letter from Middelburg to Dordrecht ordering that the construction of a castle by Dirk Loef in Munnikenland should be prevented. The name Loevestein refers to Dirk Loef as "Loef's stein" (stone house). The audacious construction and the use that Dirk Loef made of the castle was probably instrumental in his downfall.

== Downfall ==
=== The Arkel influence ===
John IV, Lord of Arkel had supported Willem V of Horne, and had arranged his marriage to his daughter Machteld. At the time that Willem V died, John IV had been in conflict with the counts of Holland, and this probably favored his succession by Dirk Loef. However, Willem (VI) son of Willem V and Machteld still had a very strong claim on all of Willem V's inheritance. The Arkels could therefore be expected to want Willem VI to get Dirk Loef's possessions.

In 1360 Otto, Lord of Arkel succeeded his father. He quickly came to favor with Count Albert of Bavaria. In 1364 John of Arkel became Bishop of Liège, and in 1366 Liège annexed the County of Loon. This way John of Arkel became Dirk Loef's liege lord for Horne and Kortessem. This was a very dangerous development for Dirk Loef.

=== Conflict with Albert of Bavaria ===
Instead of trying appease his potential enemies, Dirk Loef came into a feud with Otto of Arkel, which lasted till July 1364. In January 1367 Dirk Loef did take part in one of Albert's campaigns, and seems to have returned to favor for a while. Later that year Dirk Loef announced that he had married, probably to Elisabeth of Montigny.

Albert of Bavaria then summoned Dirk Loef to serve him with soldiers as Lord of Altena. Dirk Loef refused claiming that as Lord of Altena, he had no such obligation. While in Antwerp on 25 February 1368, Dirk Loef was then forced to agree to arbitration by the count and countess. He was next forced to accompany them to Middelburg, where they pronounced a verdict on 28 March. They forbade him to leave Middelburg before declaring that he would submit to the verdict.

The verdict declared that Dirk Loef had illegally levied toll on the rivers near Loevestein. Dirk Loef did this based on a privilege to levy toll, sold to the Van Horne's by Emperor Louis in 1323. Albert declared that this privilege was void, because the emperor did not possess the toll right. Dirk Loef was sentenced to declare that his toll had been illegal, and would not be levied in the future. Dirk Loef was also judged to have illegally extorted money from inhabitants of the Land of Altena. Dirk Loef was sentenced to repay this money. Dirk Loef was furthermore judged to have committed arson in the territory of Arkel during the siege of Gorinchem. Dirk Loef was sentenced to declare that he did not know it was a Holland fief, or else to pay for the damage. A remarkable charge was that he had forced people in Altena to swear that he was their liege lord, while this was Willem VI. 'Want er een recht oir is van Huerne, also sijns broeders soen, ende hij mitsgaders egheen recht here daaraf wesen en mach, also lange alse die oir levet' He had to revoke these oaths, and to return the papers relating to these oaths. There were still more charges. Otto van Arkel was the first witness and one of those that put their seal to the verdict. It can be assumed that he had a hand in it. On 2 April the sentence was made somewhat more lenient, but Dirk Loef had to declare that he had to serve the Count of Holland in his capacity as legal guardian of Willem (V). Until further notice, Dirk Loef would enjoy the income from Altena, but it would be levied by the count's officials. All this put an end to any ideas to hand Altena to Dirk Loef's children.

=== Deposed in Altena and Horne ===
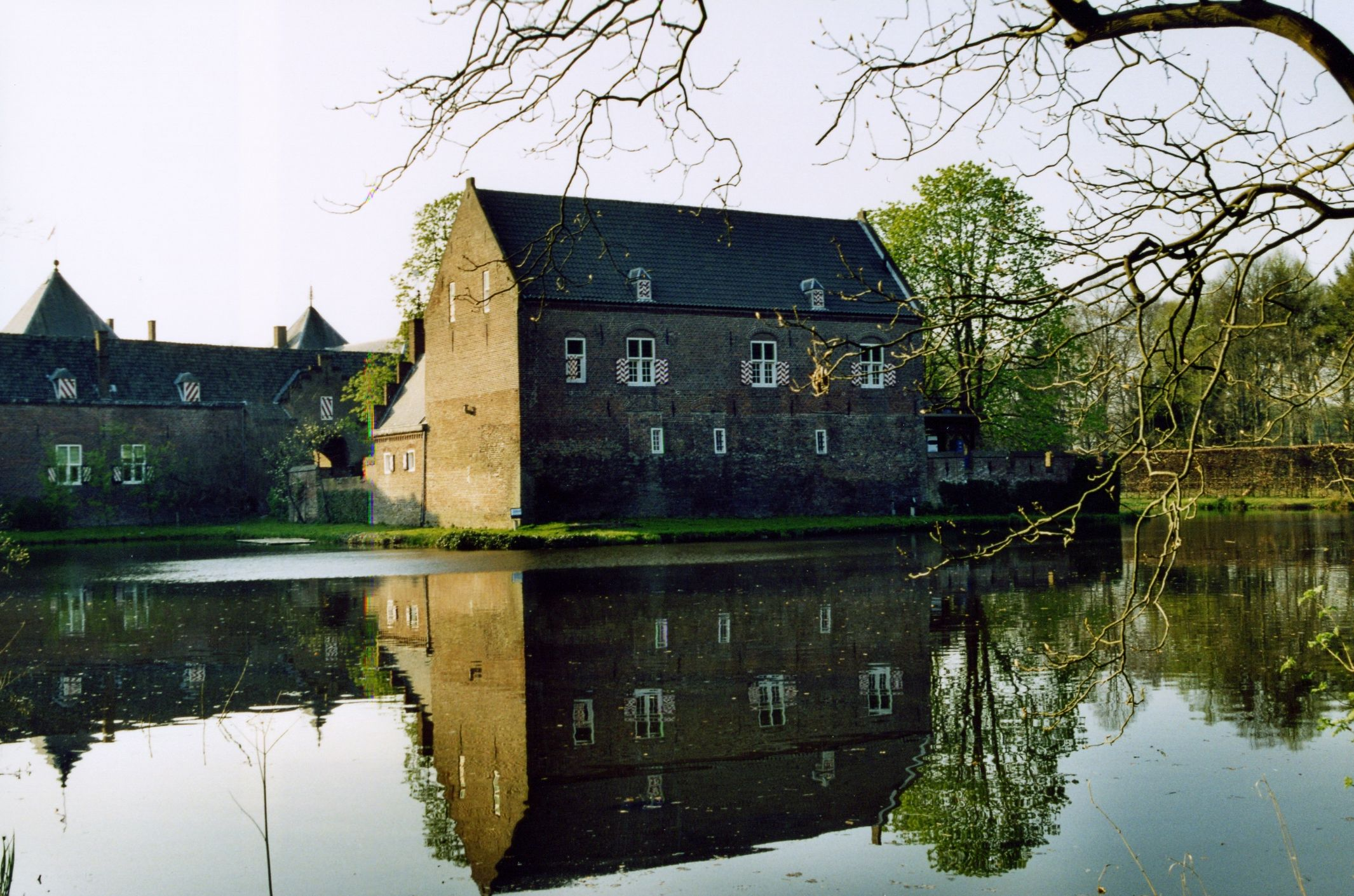
Dirk Loef retained Heeze Castle

Later in 1368, on 31 October Dirk Loef's other liege lords showed that they had joined the count of Holland. In a verdict by the Bishop of Liège, Dirk of Perwez, Jan of Polanen, and Jan of Petersheim, the part of Gerard II of Horne's inheritance which had come to Dirk Loef and his brother Arnoud was repartitioned. Dirk Loef and Arnoud now got Herstal, Heeze, Leende, Montcornet and Bancigny. Dirk Loef got Loevestein for himself. Willem VI got Altena, Horne, Weert, Wessem, Kortessem, and Munnikenland.

Dirk Loef thus lost most of what he had seized. Judged from the perspective that Willem VI was the rightful heir of Willem V, Dirk Loef should have been satisfied with the partition. He got a seizable chunk of Willem V's possessions, while he was only a younger son. The influence of Wenceslaus I, Duke of Luxembourg and Brabant, enemy of Jan van Arkel was probably decisive in this matter. At the time of both these verdicts, Willem VI was 12 years old or almost 12 years old. His 12th birthday was on 3 May 1369, or before. Which makes it indeed possible that he had not yet been born when Dirk Loef got Altena.

=== Fighting alongside his brother ===
On 9 July 1371 the fortunes of Dirk Loef changed somewhat for the better when his younger brother Arnold II of Horne became bishop of Utrecht. Dirk Loef then joined his brother in the war over Guelders. Dirk Loef was taken prisoner in Tiel. The conflict ended in November 1372. Somewhat later, there was war against Holland in 1374–1375, which probably led to Dirk Loef losing Loevestein. By 1380 it had been Albert of Bavaria's possession for at least 4 years.

In 1379 Arnold II became Bishop of Liège. Somewhere in the 1380s Dirk Loef was taken prisoner during a surprise raid on Montcornet Castle. Arnold did not succeed in retrieving Loevestein for his brother. He probably did succeed in giving Kessenich to Dirk Loef's son Jan.

=== Final years ===
On 8 March 1389 Arnold II of Horne died. Between 1392 and 1396 Dirk Loef lost Moncornet. Dirk Loef died somewhere between 1 July 1400 and 19 July 1403. His son Arnold and his successors would hold on to Bancigny, Heeze and Leende for centuries. In 1590 a far successor, Gerard of Horne became a count because Bancigny was made a County by Henry IV of France.

== Overview ==
It seems that Dirk Loef was always short of money, in spite of being very rich. Dirk Loef's preference for parties and tournaments probably played its part in this. It also seems that he did not pay much heed to the rights of his subjects in quest for money. The delay with which he fulfilled his obligations to his equals and his betters confirms this judgement.
