= Willem VI of Horne =

- Lord of Horne (1369-1405)
- Arms of Horne
- Predecessor: Dirk Loef of Horne
- Successor: Willem VII of Horne
- Born: bef. 3 May 1357
- Died: 1417
- Mother: Machteld van Arkel

Willem VI of Horne was a Dutch Nobleman, the Lord of Horne.

== Family ==
Willem VI van Horne was the only child of Willem V van Horne and Mechteld van Arkel. When he was born, the inheritance of Willem IV of Horne was still contested between the children of his first marriage and those of his second marriage. The children of the second marriage were Willem V of Horne, his younger brothers Dirk Loef of Horne and Arnold II of Horne, and Elisabeth van Horne.

== Early years ==
Willem VI van Horne was born after 28 February 1357, and on or before 3 May 1357. Which dates are calculated from that he reached adulthood (12 years) in 1369. However it's not clear how and whether these dates take account of the new year starting in March in medieval times.

The date of Willem VI's father's death is also not that certain. For both reasons, it is quite possible that his father died before Willem VI was born.

The confusion about the dates is important, because count William V of Holland granted Altena to Willem's uncle Dirk Loef of Horne on 3 April 1357. If William VI had been alive at that time, it would have been a grant as his guardian. If William VI was not yet born, Dirk Loef might have gotten the fief as his own possession. It is supposed that after Dirk Loef got the fief, his mother went to her father, taking the future Willem VI with her.

In 1358 Albert of Bavaria became regent for his insane brother. There are no indications that Albert or his predecessor cared about the legitimacy of the succession by Dirk Loef, and him styling himself as Lord of Horne and Altena. However, when Dirk made himself impossible with the count, and Otto, Lord of Arkel became very influential, Albert of Bavaria intervened. Dirk Loef's liege lords in Guelders, Loon and Jülich did the same. In Holland Dirk Loef was forced to submit to a verdict which declared that he was only the guardian of Willem VI.

Next, a general repartition of Dirk Loef's possessions was made on 20 February 1369. Willem VI was to get Horne, Weert, Wessem, and Kortessem. He would also get Altena and Munnikenland. The latter without Loevestein Castle, but if Dirk Loef wanted to sell it, he first had to offer it to Willem VI for 3,500 Brabant mottoens. Dirk Loef and his brother retained Herstal, Heeze, Leende, Montcornet, Bancigny, and Loevestein Castle.

== Lord of Horne and Altena ==
=== First years as a Lord ===
On 3 May 1369, Dirk Loef transferred Horne and Alten to Willem VI of Horne. Willem VI then probably went to Le Quesnoy in Hainault to receive the formal grant from regent Albert of Bavaria, count of Holland.

On 24 June 1369, Willem VI granted the lordship of Giessen to Vastraerd van Giessen. The grant included the ferry at Andel, the jurisdiction over Poederoijen, and the lands outside the dikes at Giessen and Andel. Some grants to Wouter van de Wale citizen of Dordrecht, followed in July. Willem VI then went to Liège, where his relative John of Arkel ruled from 1364 to 1378. Willem VI would often stay in Liège during this time.

During the First War of the Guelderian Succession (1371–1379) Willem VI fought on the side of John II, Count of Blois for a while. This was caused by Bishop Jan van Arkel being in conflict with the other pretender, who was supported by William II, Duke of Jülich. After the Duke of Jülich had freed Wenceslaus I, Duke of Luxembourg in 1372, his conflict with Liège ended, and Willem VI probably also ended his participation in the war.

=== Marriage ===
By 20 May 1374, Willem VI was married to Johanna, daughter of Godfried of Heinsberg and Philippa of Jülich. Willem granted her an income of 800 gold guilders a year, payable on Horne.

=== In favor ===
After the marriage, and after Regent Albert's daughter was promised to the Jülich pretender, Willem VI was solidly on the side of Holland. In 1373, Regent Albert summoned Otto van Arkel and Willem VI to serve him against Utrecht, where Willem's uncle Arnold II was bishop. The summons came too late, but one can assume that Willem supported Albert later in the war.

In 1374, Willem VI helped Regent Albert to close a hole in the dike near Werkendam, without being obliged to do so. The act was very much appreciated by the count. On 28 February 1375 Willem was one of the nobles who put their seal on the confirmation of a contract for a planned marriage between Albert's oldest son Willem, and Maria daughter of the king of France.

In 1375, there were many ruptures in the dikes of the lands of Heusden and Altena. These caused heavy repair costs and decreased income from the land. Regent Albert issued an order to force the inhabitants of Heusden and Altena to repair the dikes. This might have caused financial trouble for Willem VI. On 20 December 1376 he gave the fief of Kortessem back to the Bishop of Liège, so it could be temporarily granted to Otto van Arkel. Willem would retrieve it on 19 April 1378.

During these years there were more transactions that imply that Willem VI was often short of money. In 1382, Willem had borrowed 1,500 old shields from Claes van Zevender. In return, he promised not to end Claes' offices in Altena as castellan, bailiff, dijkgraaf, land agent and tax collector of the Woudrichem market, as well as his office as land agent of Munnikenland.

Willem VI did not play a significant role in the politics of his times. In general he cooperated with his uncle Otto, Lord of Arkel till 1386. In 1385 Willem and Otto were both counsellors of Regent Albert.

== Demise in Holland ==
=== Deposed in Altena ===
In early 1386 relations between Willem, Regent Albert, and the Van Arkels seemed to be still fine. However, on 8 May 1386, Albert ordered Dirk van Polanen to effect a cease fire between the Lords of Horne and Arkel. Obviously Willem had suddenly come into conflict with his old allies. This was also the time that Willem made an agreement for Woudrichem to build city walls. In a 9 September 1386 declaration, Regent Albert stated that he had repossessed the fief of Altena from Willem VI.

=== Siege of Altena Castle ===
While Regent Albert could declare the retraction of the fief of Altena, this did not mean that Willem VI lost control of his fief. The count had to invade the area in order to take control. In May 1387, Albert of Bavaria and his son Willem van Oostervant and a small army of 500 men went to Woudrichem. Willem van Oostervant was then declared Lord of Altena by force.

Altena Castle still resisted. The siege of the castle was left to some commanders. By 22 May 1387, a truce till mid-August had been concluded. The truce seems to have been of the type that the besieged would surrender if no help arrived before that date, but this is a guess. Soon after, Willem van Oostervant gained full control of Altena and its castle.

== Last phase ==
In 1389, John III, Duke of Bavaria, a younger son of Albert of Bavaria became Prince-Bishop of Liège. John quickly confirmed the grant of Horne and Kortessem to Willem VI. However, John did end some other rights that Willem had gained during the reign of Jan van Arkel.

Willem VI probably transferred his lands to his son in 1405. Willem VI was still alive in 1417. However the details of the conclusion of the marriage contract between his daughter Oda and Jan van Ghemen make it likely that he was either ill or dementing at the time. Which could in turn explain the early handover in 1405.

Other sources claim that Willem VI was killed on 25 October 1415 in the Battle of Agincourt.

== Offspring ==
With Johanna of Heinsberg, Willem VI had:

- Willem VII, lord of Horne
- Machteld van Horne
- Johanna van Horne
- Oda van Horne married Jan van Ghemen.

== Sources ==
- Van de Boel, W.M. (1989), De heren van Horne (PDF), Stichting Historisch Onderzoek Weert
- Goethals, Félix-Victor (1848), Histoire généalogique de la maison de Hornes, Imprimerie Polack-Duvivier, Bruxelles
- Hardenberg, H. (1934), De stichting van het slot Loevestein, Gouda Quint, Arnhem
- Klaversma, Taede (1989), "De heren van Horne, Altena en Kortessem (1345 -1433)" (PDF), Weert in woord en beeld: jaarboek voor Weert, vol. IV, Stichting Weerter Publikaties, Weert, p. 51–65
- Klaversma, Taede (1992), "De heren van Horne, Altena en Kortessem (1345 -1433) (slot)" (PDF), Weert in woord en beeld: jaarboek voor Weert, vol. VI, Stichting Weerter Publikaties, Weert, p. 122-138
- Van Mieris, Frans (1755), Groot charterboek der graaven van Holland, van Zeeland, en heeren van Vriesland, vol. III, Pieter vander Eyk, Leyden
- Wolters, Mathias Joseph (1850), Notice historique sur l'ancien comté de Hornes et sur les anciennes de Weert, Wessem, Ghoor et Kessenich, Gyselynck
