= Willem V of Horne =

- Lord of Horne
- Arms of Horne
- Predecessor: Gerard II of Horne
- Successor: Dirk Loef of Horne
- Born: c. 1337
- Died: 1357

Willem V of Horne (c. 1337 - 1357) was a medieval nobleman.

== Family ==
Willem V of Horne, was the oldest son of Willem IV of Horne and Elisabeth ('Else') of Kleef-Hülchrath. When Willem IV died, almost all of the inheritance went to Gerard II of Horne, oldest son out of his first marriage. The children of his second marriage were promised: Heeze, Leende and Herstal, but it seems that they did not get these lands.

In older works Willem V of Horne was called Willem VI of Horne.

== Early years ==
=== Death of Gerard II of Horne ===
The death of Gerard II of Horne in the September 1345 Battle of Warns was a massive blow for the Horne family. Gerard II had been a lord for only about two years. He had not yet married, and there are no signs that he had made any legal arrangements for a premature death.

=== Willem V of Horne's inheritance ===
Willem van Horne was about 8 years old when his half-brother Gerard II died. His interests were promoted by his uncle Dirk van Horne, oldest son of Gerard I and Irmgard of Kleve. He was opposed by Gerard II's sister Johanna van Horne, married to Gijsbrecht III of Abcoude.

The Lordship of Horne, and the Lordship of Kortessem were fiefs from the County of Loon. These allowed succession by brothers, not by sisters. Dirk van Horne had little trouble to get these for Willem as fifth Lord of Horne. During his minority Dirk would be his guardian.

The Lordship of Weert, the Guardianship of Thorn Abbey, the village Beket, and Munnikenland were fiefs of the Duchy of Guelders. Reginald III, Duke of Guelders acknowledged Dirk van Horne as guardian for Willem V. Dirk van Horne also became guardian of the Lordship of Wessem, which was a fief from the County of Jülich.

The Lordship of Altena was a fief from the County of Holland. It could only be inherited from father to son. Therefore, this fief reverted to the Count of Holland. However, the Count of Holland had also been killed without an obvious heir, and nobody dared to seize the Lordship.

In the Duchy of Brabant fiefs could be inherited by both sons and daughters, but sons had priority when the degree of relationship was equal. Willem was only a half brother of the deceased Gerard II, while Johanna was his full sister. This seems to have been reason enough for John III, Duke of Brabant to grant Gaasbeek, Herstal, Loon op Zand, and Heeze-Leende to Gijsbrecht III of Abcoude as spouse of Johanna van Horne. It might very well be that Jan III could have another choice, but was not inclined to, because Dirk van Horne was related to Kleve, and Gijsbrecht was more popular with Jan III.

Montcornet and Bancigny were granted to Gijsbrecht and Johanna by the King of France.

=== The struggle for Altena ===
The situation in Altena was complicated. The fief had legally reverted to the Count of Holland on Gerard II's death. However, already on 20 December 1345 Dirk van Horne was granted the fief Altena by emperor Louis the Bavarian (reign 1314–1347). Meanwhile, nobody dared to seize the fief. This indicates that the population of Altena generally preferred to continue under the Van Horne's. The presence of Altena Castle (Almkerk), which could not be taken that easily, might also have played its part.

On 15 January 1346 the emperor Louis the Bavarian granted Holland, Zeeland and Hainaut to Margaret II, Countess of Hainaut. In March 1346 she arrived in Hainaut. On 17 March she then made a surprising move, by promising to grant Altena to Gijsbrecht III of Abcoude within one month of her expected arrival in Holland. After arriving in April 1346, she indeed granted Altena to Gijsbrecht, and so did her son, William V of Holland.

In September 1346 Margaretha returned to Germany, leaving her second son, the 13 year old William (later William V) to rule Holland in her absence. It was a chaotic time, and in these circumstance Knight Willem van Rijswijk traveled to The Hague on 26 September 1347. On the very same day, the Land of Altena was granted to the 10 year old Willem van Horne, as if he had been present.

=== Marriage ===
The final investiture with Altena might have been brought about by the support of John IV, Lord of Arkel. He was a supporter of Willem V, and one of the main members of the 'Cod league' formed in 1350 during the Hook and Cod wars.

On 27 June 1348 the pope granted permission (dispensation) for the marriages between the relatives Willem van Horne and Machteld van Arkel, daughter of Jan IV. They had been married by 6 August 1349.

== Hook and Cod Wars ==
=== First phase ===
During the Hook and Cod Wars Willem V van Horne sided with his father in law John IV of Arkel. In the first phases of the war Willem profited from this choice. The 14 year-old Willem joined Lord Arkel in the siege of Geertruidenberg (1351-1352). On 21 April 1351 Willem then got another letter confirming the grant of Altena.

=== War with Utrecht (1354-1356) ===
In 1354 Count William V of Holland moved his tollhouse from near Sliedrecht to Woudrichem, about 20 km upstream. This was severely disadvantageous to Woudrichem, a place subject to Altena. It also seemed to infringe on the sovereignty of the Lord of Altena. It was one of the reasons that the relation between the count and the Lords of Arkel and Altena soured.

When war broke out between Holland and Utrecht in November 1355, Arkel paid money to the count, in order not to have to fight his half-brother the bishop. Willem van Horne and the Land of Altena did nothing to support their overlord. After the war, this led to the Land of Altena having to pay an indemnity to the count and its lord, while Willem would also have to serve Count William with 20 men for two months, when summoned.

== Death ==
On 3 April 1357 Willem's younger brother Dirk Loef van Horne was granted the Land of Altena by Count William V of Holland. It is not clear why the count did this. It is possible that the count wanted to grant Altena to a more reliable partner. Dirk Loef did help the count in the war against Utrecht. He also paid 4,000 Bruges shields to the count for his succession. Dirk Loef was helped by his uncle Dirk van Horne, who was by then known as Dirk of Perwez.

Another option is that Willem V had died before 3 April 1357, and that his son had not yet been born. In that case, the fief would have been void on 3 April, and the payment for the grant would have been very regular.

== Offspring ==
Willem V and Machteld van Arkel had:

- Willem VI of Horne (1358-1415), Lord of Horn

After Willem V died, his widow Machteld van Arkel quickly remarried to Boudewijn III of Steinfurt.
