= Willem IV of Horne =

Medieval Dutch nobleman

- Lord of Horne
- Arms of Horne
- Predecessor: Gerard I of Horne
- Successor: Gerard II of Horne
- Born: c. 1303
- Died: 1343
- Mother: Johanna of Leuven-Gaasbeek

Willem IV of Horne (1303–1343) was Lord of Altena, Weert, Nederweert, Wessem, Heeze, Leende, and Cortessem. From his niece Beatrice of Leuven he inherited Gaasbeek, Leeuw, Herstal and Montcornet.

== Early career ==
In late 1321 Willem van Horne became 18 years old, and took control of Altena. This did not mean that he became its official lord. For that to happen, he had to be invested by the count of Kleve. Nevertheless, father no longer called himself Lord of Altena from 1321.

Willem van Horne seems to have cultivated a good relation with the Count of Holland. The Count of Kleve did not acknowledge him as Lord of Altena. He probably wanted to give it to Willem's younger brother Dirk, son of Gerard and the Count's sister Irmgard. In 1327 Count William III of Holland then promised to maintain Squire Willem van Horne's possession of Altena as long as he did not get what he was entitled to.

== As Lord of Horne ==
Willem's father probably died on 1 April 1330. The succession as Lord of Horne seems to have gone smoothly. The same was probably true for Loon op Zand. Herlaer and Kranenburg went to Irmgard's children.

Shortly before his death, his father had finally asked the Count of Kleve to acknowledge his son Willem as Lord of Altena. On 14 March 1330 Count Willem III of Holland called Willem van Horne Knight and Lord of Altena. The acknowledgement by the Count of Kleve must have come in before November 1332.

In November 1332 the count of Kleve sold his overlordship over Altena to Count William III of Holland. He also transferred all duties that Willem van Horne had towards the Count of Kleve to the Count of Holland.

Somewhat earlier, a coalition had been formed against Willem's liege lord John III, Duke of Brabant, members were his other liege lords the counts of Guelders, Loon and Gulik, as well the Bishop of Liège and Jan of Beaumont. Beaumont was the brother of count William III, who stayed neutral himself. In April 1332 these had assembled west of Liège and attacked Brabant.

Willem of Horne remained neutral. He did however create a feudal bond between his allodial villages Heeze and Leende, and the Brabant Duke in 1933. In turn the Brabant duke promised him the rich inheritance of his niece Beatrice of Louvain, lady of Gaasbeek and Herstal. Soon after, he got the management of her estate, making him a powerful man in Brabant.

Willem's wife Oda died between 1330 and 1336. In 1336 Willem of Horne then remarried. His second wife was Elizabeth, daughter and heiress of Dirk Loef III of Kleve, count of Hülchrath. She would bring in a rich inheritance. However, the County of Hülchrath was not part of it.

The last will of Willem IV is dated 1 October 1342. He died in 1343.

== Overview of Willem IV's activities ==
Willem IV was far more involved in politics than his father Gerard I. Apart from that, he's not known to have got much money, or lucrative jobs from his political activities. He is also not known as a diplomat or a soldier.

A downside of political activities was that these cost a lot money. Willem also had take care of his 11 children. In the end he could transfer almost all of his estate to his children. How he managed to do this is unknown.

== Family ==
=== Parents ===
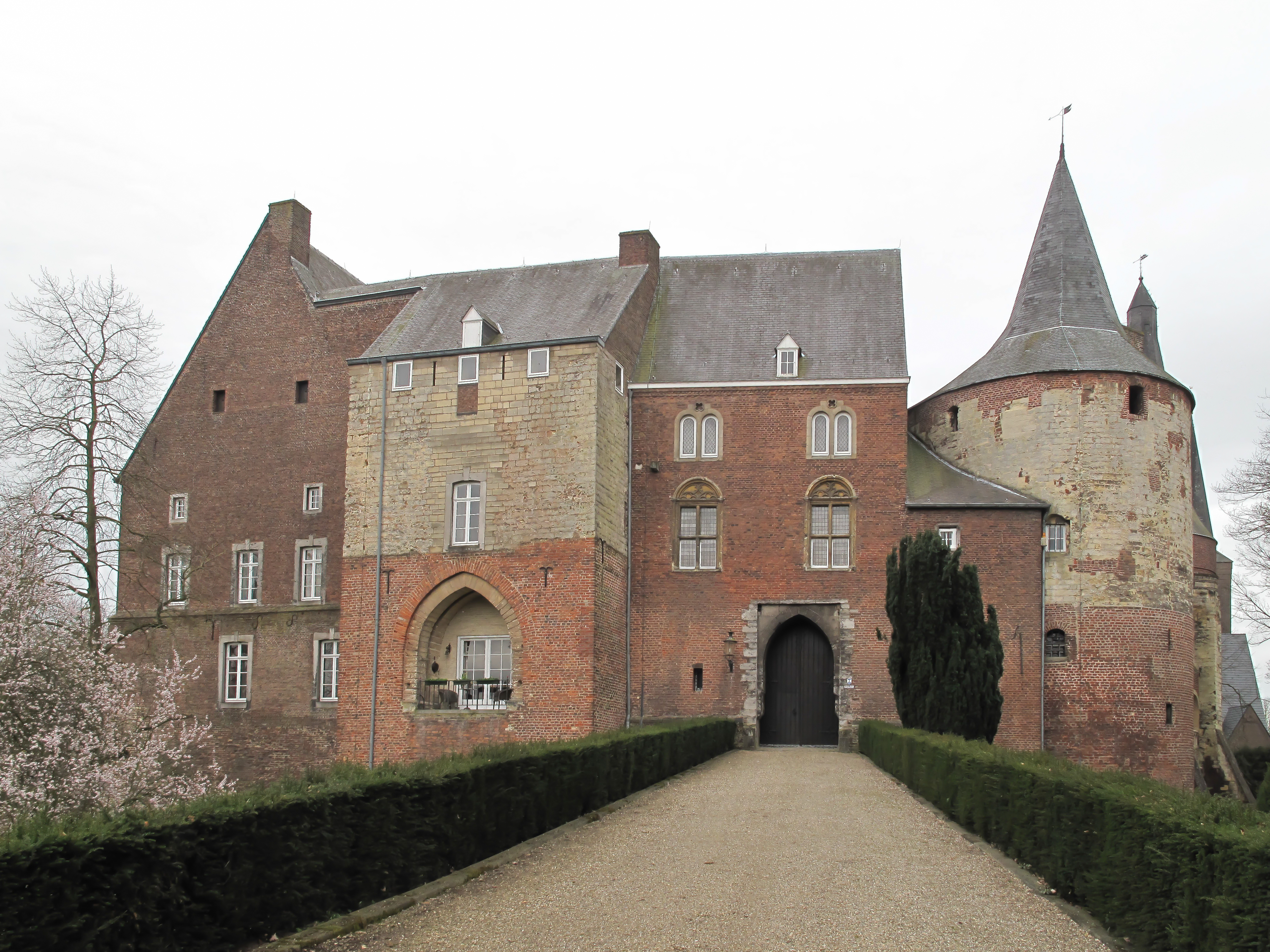
Horn Castle, ancestral seat of the Horne family

Willem van Horne, 4th Lord of Horne named Willem, was the son of Gerard I of Horne and Johanna of Leuven-Gaasbeek. Gerard I of Horne (1270 - 1331) was Lord of Horne, Altena, Perwez, Heeze, Oud Herlaer (since 1315) and Barendrecht. In September 1302 Gerard married Johanna of Leuven-Gaasbeek. They got Margaretha van Horne and our Willem van Horne. In 1316 Gerard I married Irmgard of Kleve, of which Dirk of Horne (1320).

Willem IV's father Gerard I had succeeded to his older brother Willem III of Horne. For the Land van Altena, its overlord the Count of Kleve did not want to recognize him straight away. Gerard I therefore sought the support of Nicolaas van Putten, a very influential man in the County of Holland. In 1305 he agreed on a marriage contract between his son Willem van Horne and Oda van Putten, second daughter of Nicolaas. One of the stipulations was that Willem van Horne would get Altena as soon as he was twelve years old. In 1306 Gerard was recognized by Kleve as Lord of Altena.

=== Marriage ===
On 21 December 1315 a new treaty was made about the marriage of the then about 12 years old future Willem IV and Oda van Putten. The marriage was effected before November 1316. This treaty probably delayed the moment that Gerard I had to hand over Altena to Willem. Gerard would remain in control of Altena till 1321.

=== Offspring ===
From his first marriage with Oda van Putten:

- Johanna van Horne (1320-1356) married Gijsbrecht III of Abcoude.
- Gerard II of Horne (1320-1345)
- Oda van Horne (1320-1353) married John II, Lord of Polanen, Lord of Polanen, Lek and Breda
- Aleida van Horne (1320-) married Dirk of Cranendonk
- Elisabeth van Horne (1326-1360) married Johan II van Arkel Lord of Heukelom (1310-1373).
- Agnes van Horne abbess of Rijnsburg Abbey

From his Second marriage with Elisabeth of Kleef-Hülchrath:

- Willem V of Horne (1335-1357)
- Dirk Loef of Horne (1338, c. 1402)
- Elisabeth van Horne (1339, c. 1416) married Hendrik of Diest (1345-1385).
- Arnold II of Horne (1339-1389) Bishop of Utrecht (1371-1378), Bishop of Liège (1378-1389).
