= Bokhoven =

Coordinates: 51°44′N 5°14′E

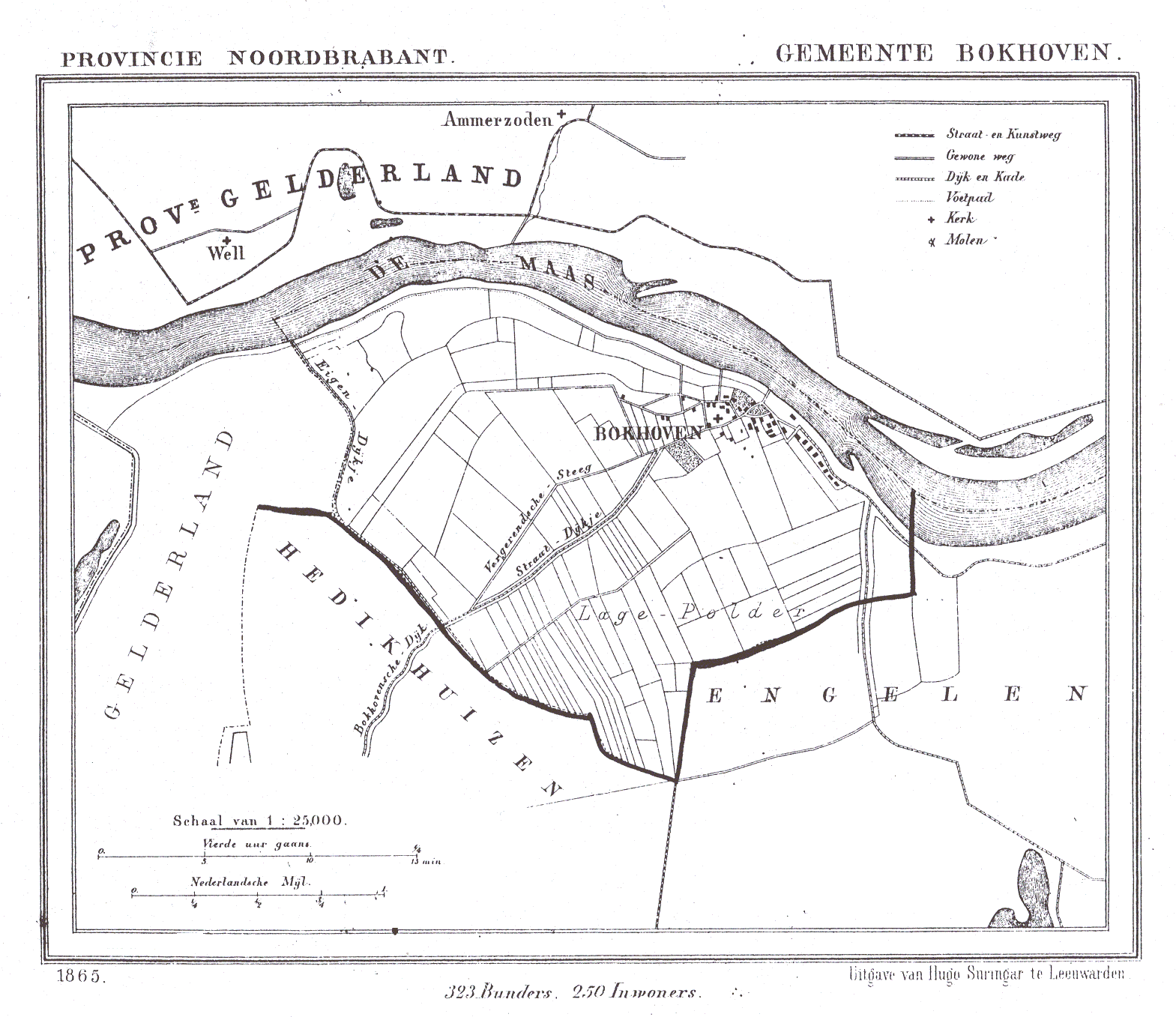
A map of the municipality Bokhoven in 1865

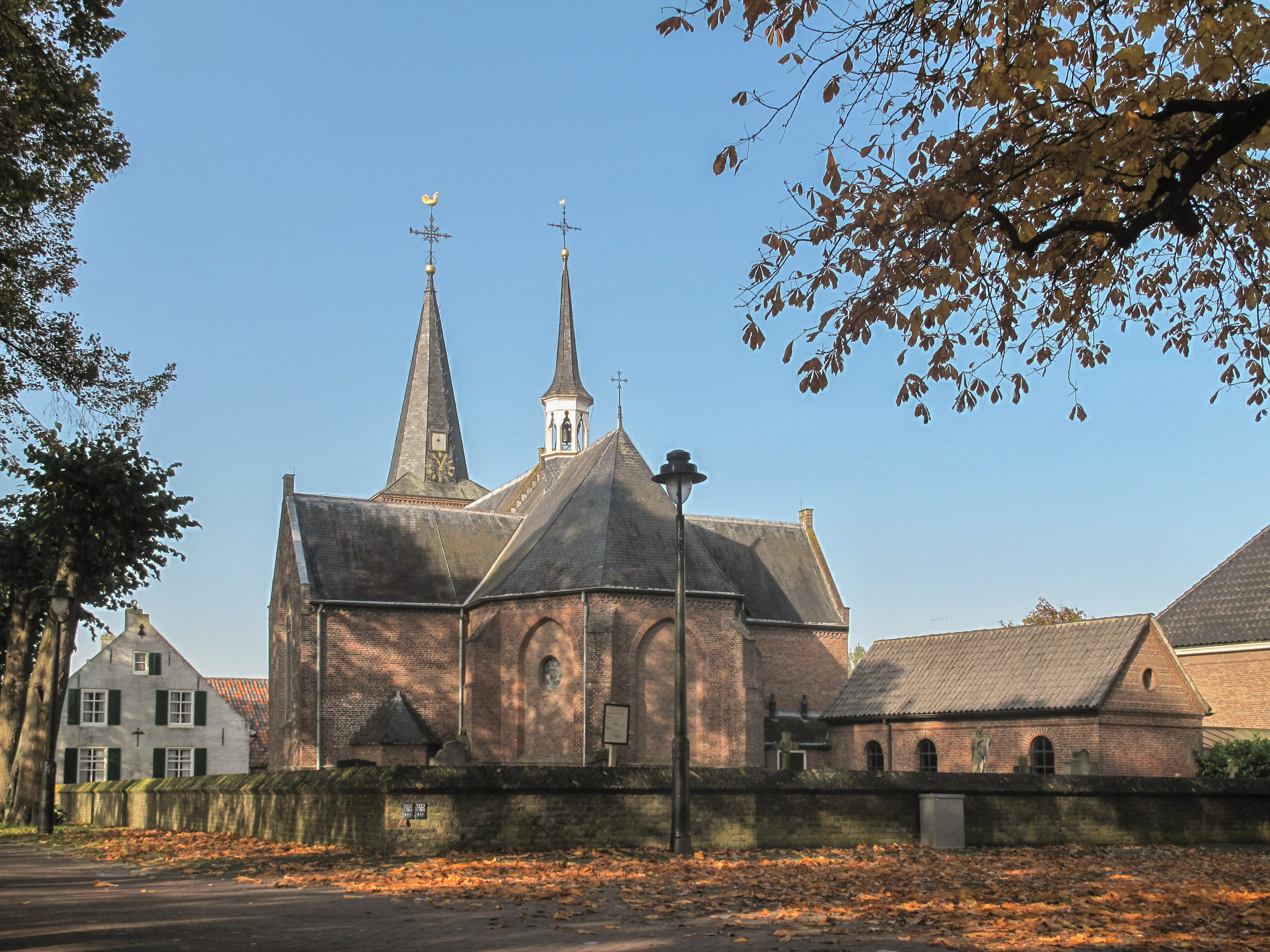
Bokhoven, church: Kerk van de Sint Antonius Abt

Bokhoven is a village in the Netherlands, in the municipality of 's-Hertogenbosch. It is located about seven kilometres northwest of the city center, on the south bank of the river Maas.

== History ==
Until 1795 Bokhoven was a quasi independent state. In the fourteenth century Bokhoven Castle had been built in the village. It became the center of the Lordship (later county) of Bokhoven, which was a loan of the Prince-Bishopric of Liège. After the Dutch revolt in 1579 Bokhoven became an enclave of the Holy Roman Empire within the Dutch Republic. The counts remained Roman Catholic after the Protestant Reformation. This way the county provided an opportunity for Catholic inhabitants living in the surrounding areas under the control of the Calvinists to attend Catholic services.

In 1795 the Lordship Bokhoven was annexed by the French First Republic. In 1800 it was sold to the Batavian Republic, a precursor state of the present Kingdom of the Netherlands in which Bokhoven became a municipality. In 1922 it was annexed by the municipality Engelen, which again was annexed by 's-Hertogenbosch in 1971. In earlier times a settlement of farmers and fishermen, the present population of the village, about three hundred people, consists mostly of middle class commuters.
