= Gerard II of Horne =

- Lord of Horne
- Arms of Horne
- Predecessor: Willem IV of Horne
- Successor: Willem V of Horne; Johanna of Horne
- Born: 1324
- Died: 26 September 1345; Near Stavoren
- Mother: Oda van Putten

Gerard II of Horne (1324 - 26 September 1345) was a medieval nobleman.

== Family ==
Gerard van Horne, second lord of Horne named Gerard, was the son of Willem IV of Horne and Oda van Putten of Strijen. He had 5 sisters. From his father's second marriage, Gerard had three half brothers and a half sister.

== Career ==
in 1342 Gerard's father made arrangements for his succession. Gerard was immediately made Lord of Heeze, Leende, the land of Montcornet and of Bancigny. On the death of his father, he was planned to succeed him as Lord of Gaasbeek. In turn he would then have to give Heeze, Leende and Herstal to the children of his father's second marriage. It's not that clear whether arrangements were made for his other possessions, but maybe that was not necessary, or not possible.

After his father's death in 1343 Gerard succeed his father as Lord of Horne and Lord of Altena. He also succeeded to the lordship of Venloon One might assume that he also became lord of Weert and Kortessem. It's not clear whether he gave Heeze, Leende and Herstal to the children of his father's second marriage.

== Death ==
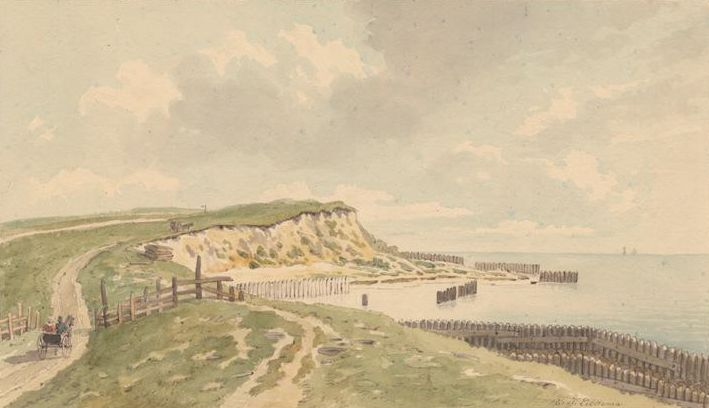
The red cliff as it used to be

In 1345 Gerard II joined William IV, Count of Holland in his campaign against Friesland. On 26 September 1345 almost the whole invasion army was annihilated near the Red Cliff in the Battle of Warns. Count William IV's uncle John of Beaumont was one of the few that escaped. Amongst the casualties were the Count of Holland, and a lot of noblemen.

Gerard II was also amongst those that were killed. See the below medieval verse, which refers to his coat of arms. It also notes that Gerard was one of the seven Knight bannerets on the Holland side, which gives an idea of Gerard's standing in Holland.

Den beste here set ic voren,
Hij droegh gout, van keel (rood) III horen,
Van silver waren si gebonden,
Manlijkc sach men tallen stonden,
Als hem last op quam oft nood
Dies is ter Vriesen bleven doot.

The best lord I'll mention first,
He wore gold, with three red horns,
These were bound by silver cords,
He was always courageous,
In trouble and in need,
This man was left dead in Frisia.

Gerard was not married. His many possessions were subject to different inheritance laws. They were also situated on the territory of different overlords. Therefore, the inheritance was divided amongst multiple claimants. His sister Johanna van Horne got some parts. Other parts went to his nephews of his father's second marriage.
