= Loon op Zand Castle =

Castle in the Netherlands

- Het Witte Kasteel
- Kasteellaan 17, Loon op Zand, the Netherlands
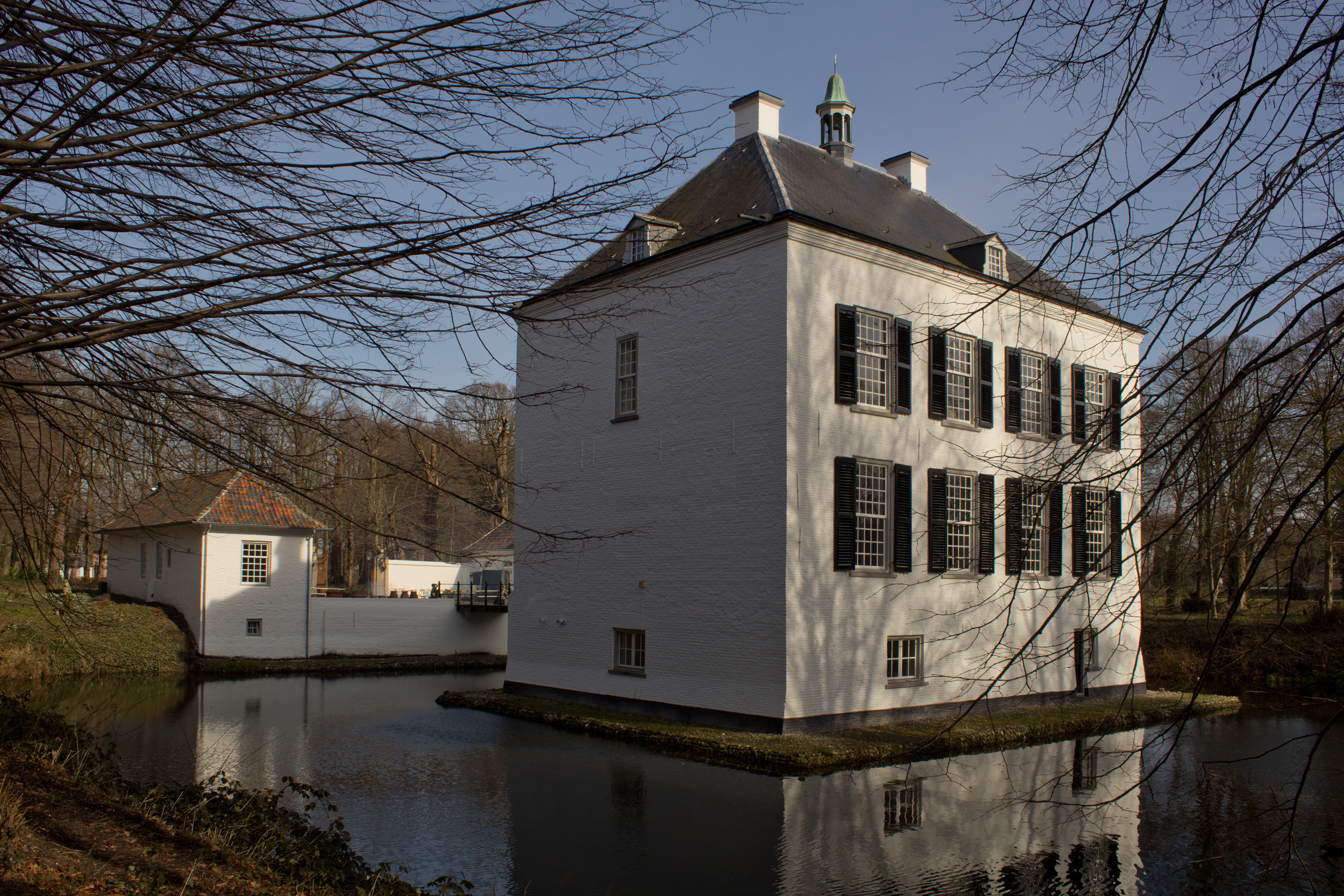
- Loon op Zand Castle in 2016

Site information
- Type: Castle
- Open to the public: Partly
- Condition: 1777 manor includes parts of castle

Location
- The Netherlands
- Coordinates: 51.624694°N 5.074472°E

Site history
- Built: 1387

Loon op Zand Castle, is a castle in Loon op Zand, in the Dutch province of North Brabant. The current building looks like a manor, but is actually the keep of a medieval castle.

== The Castle ==
=== The current castle ===
Nowadays Loon op Zand Castle is formed by a main building and a courtyard flanked by two auxiliary buildings. The main building primarily consists of remains of the former keep. The courtyard is north of main building, and is not a successor to the medieval outer bailey, which was south east of the main building. The foundations of this outer bailey might still be present underground.

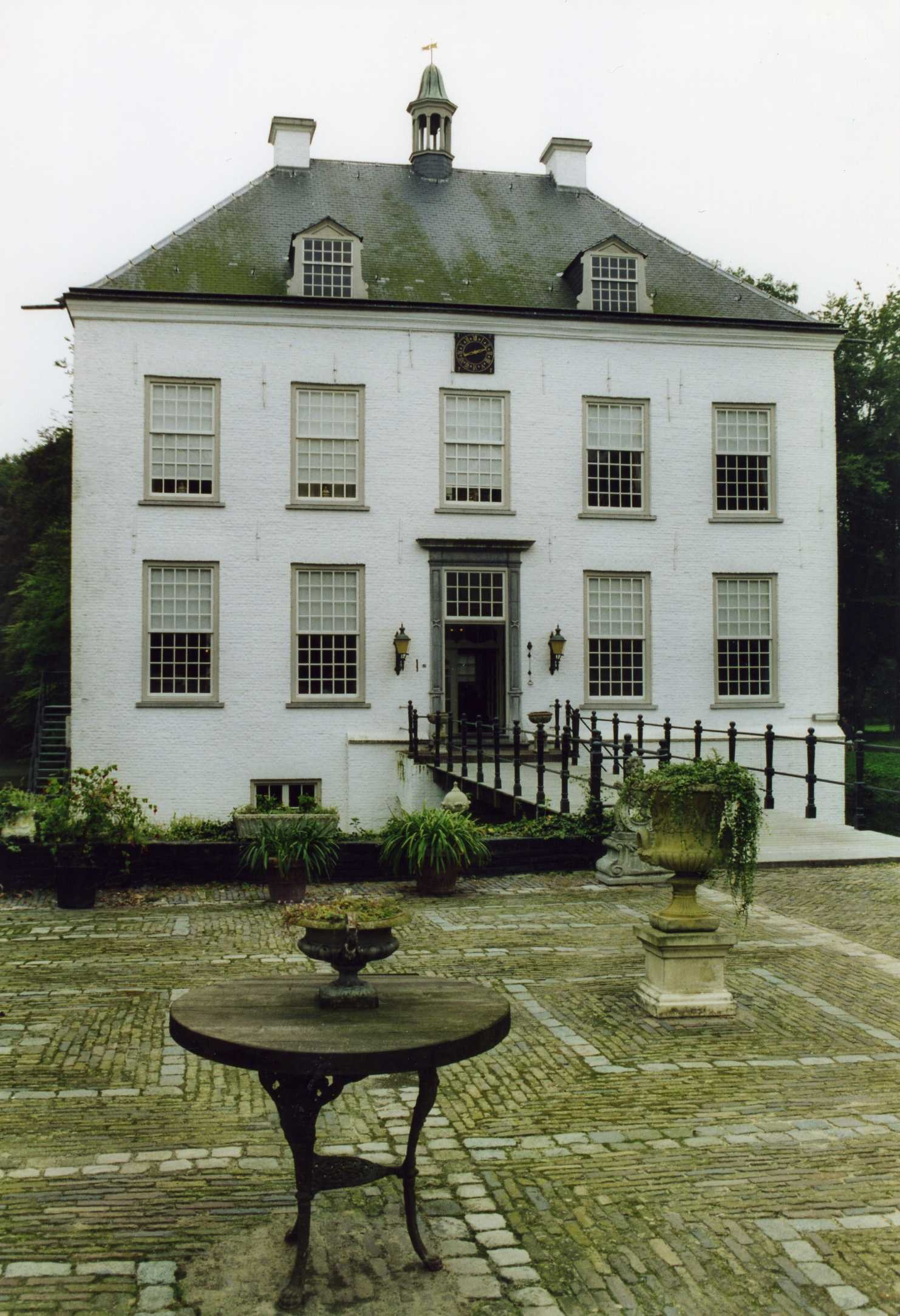
The basement level is further back left of the bridge

The main building seems a regular rectangle, but was actually built in two phases. This is shown on the basement level, where the north façade east of the bridge is 20 cm backwards. The windows on the basement level date from the 1663 reconstruction. Those on the ground and first floor date from the 1776-1777 reconstruction. The basement still contains walls of about 2 m thick. The roof dates from 1777, with re-use of parts of the 1663 roof.

The estate is now about 4 hectares and has an English garden, a French garden, a lawn and a forest garden.

=== The medieval castle ===
The first brick castle was a square tower of 12.7 by 11.44 m, with a maximum wall thickness of 2.10 m. The size of the visible bricks of this part is in line with the date of 1383–1387, which historians suppose. After the conflict with Joanna, Duchess of Brabant a new section of 12.50 of 5.82 m was added on the east side, probably shortly after 1400. The two sandstone capitals on the courtyard were probably used on the ground floor after this extension. In 1610 a description of the keep was made by a notary, giving a good impression of the tower / keep before 1663.

The old keep soon grew into a large castle with an outer bailey with other buildings on it. In the northeast corner of the current castle there are traces of an opening in the eastern wall. Before 1663 it led to a covered bridge which spanned the moat with two arcs. The outer bailey came in two parts. The covered bridge connected the keep to a small outer bailey with buildings on the south and west side, possibly also on the other sides. From there another bridge led to a much larger outer bailey, which of course had a moat, but might not have been walled. The large outer bailey was closed by a free standing gate building with the year 1536. This might point to the year that the outer bailey and the buildings on it were rebuilt or restored. The renaissance architecture on the Croes etching points to this.

=== The 1663 'apartment complex' ===
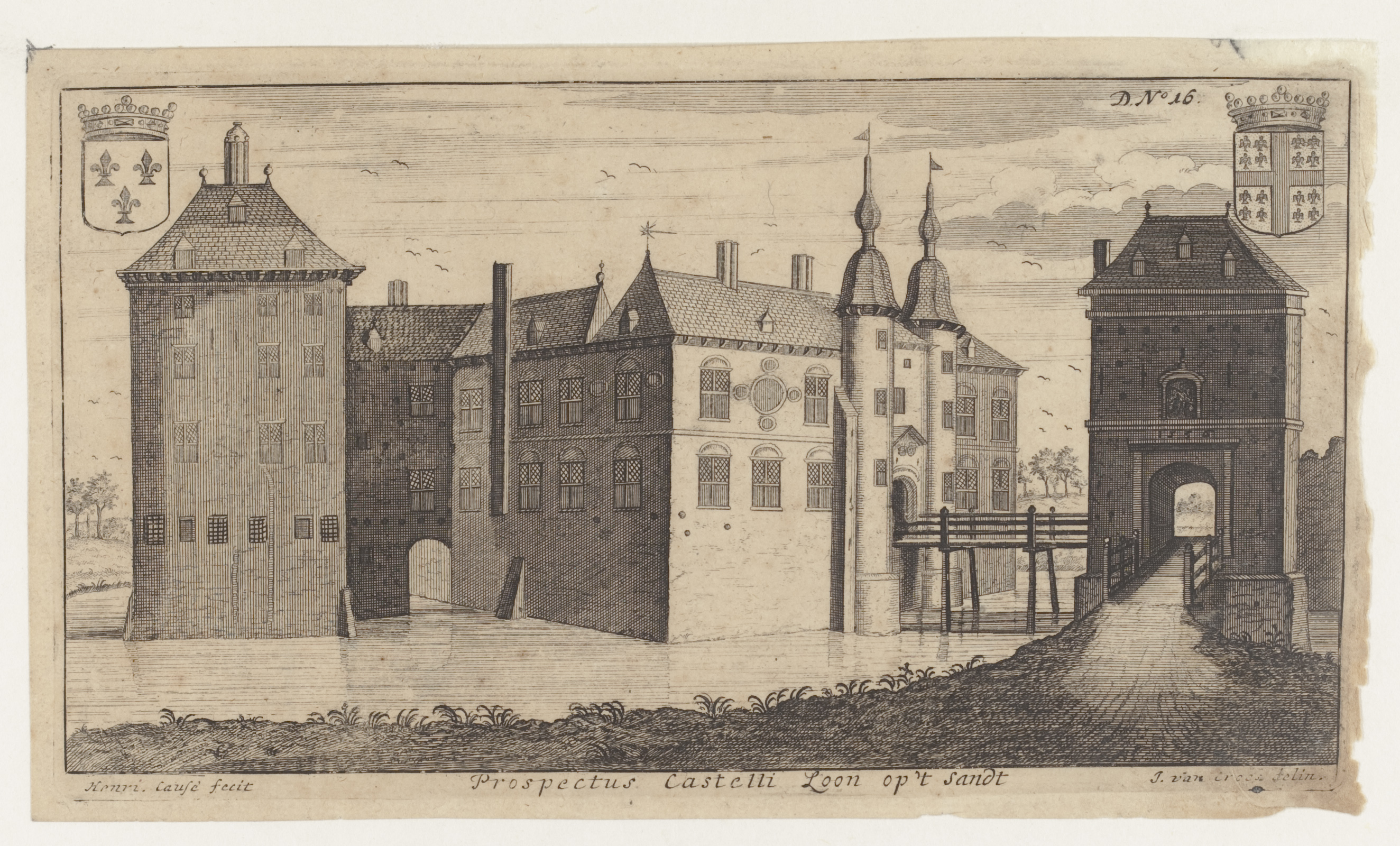
The post 1663 situation by Van Croes and Causé

In the 1660s Thomas of Immerseel started a major reconstruction of the castle. A brewery was built in 1662. In 1663 the keep was drastically renovated and changed. The north wall above the basement was broken down and rebuilt. On the inside of the other walls much brick was removed to get more space. Also, the keep was heightened with an extra floor, and got a new roof. The covered bridge was changed to a wider, impressive staircase building of the same height as the other buildings on the outer bailey. One of the arcs of the bridge building was walled up to make place for a stair to the basement. The stairs of the bridge building now gave comfortable access to the floors of the keep.

This reconstruction also changed the character of the castle. The defensible building became a residential building. The levels of the keep became apartments for guests. The 2009 research by Hermans and Orsel, focused on this reconstruction. It proved that the Causé etching indeed gives a very exact image of the castle after this reconstruction. It also proved that contrary to what was thought before, not only the basement of the current building was medieval, but that most of it is.

=== The 1777 manor ===
In 1776-1777 another major reconstruction was ordered by Louis of Salm-Salm. The keep was lowered by one floor, and got a roof which was less steep. On the inside the walls were made thinner. Windows were added and enlarged, and placed at regular intervals. The entrance was moved to the center of the north side. The outer-bailey was destroyed and replaced by a courtyard on the north side with two auxiliary buildings. A house for carriages (Koetshuis) on the east side, and on the west side the so-called Neerhuis. It all gave the building the regular appearance of a contemporary manor.

== History ==
=== The Van Horne family ===
In 1269 the Manor and Lordship Venloon (later known as Loon op Zand) were granted to Willem II of Horne (c 1230-1301) by John I, Duke of Brabant. He was succeeded by Gerard I van Horne (1270-1311). Next came Willem IV of Horne (1302-1343) married to Oda van Putten en Strijen (1295-bef.1336). Their son Gerard II of Horne (c. 1320-1345) succeeded to most of their territories, but died childless.

=== The Van Abcoude family ===
Loon op Zand was inherited by Johanna of Horne (?-1356), who married Gijsbrecht III of Abcoude. Their son Sweder of Abcoude (c. 1340-1400), sold Loon op Zand to Pauwels van Haastrecht.

=== The Van Haastrecht family (1383-1492?) ===
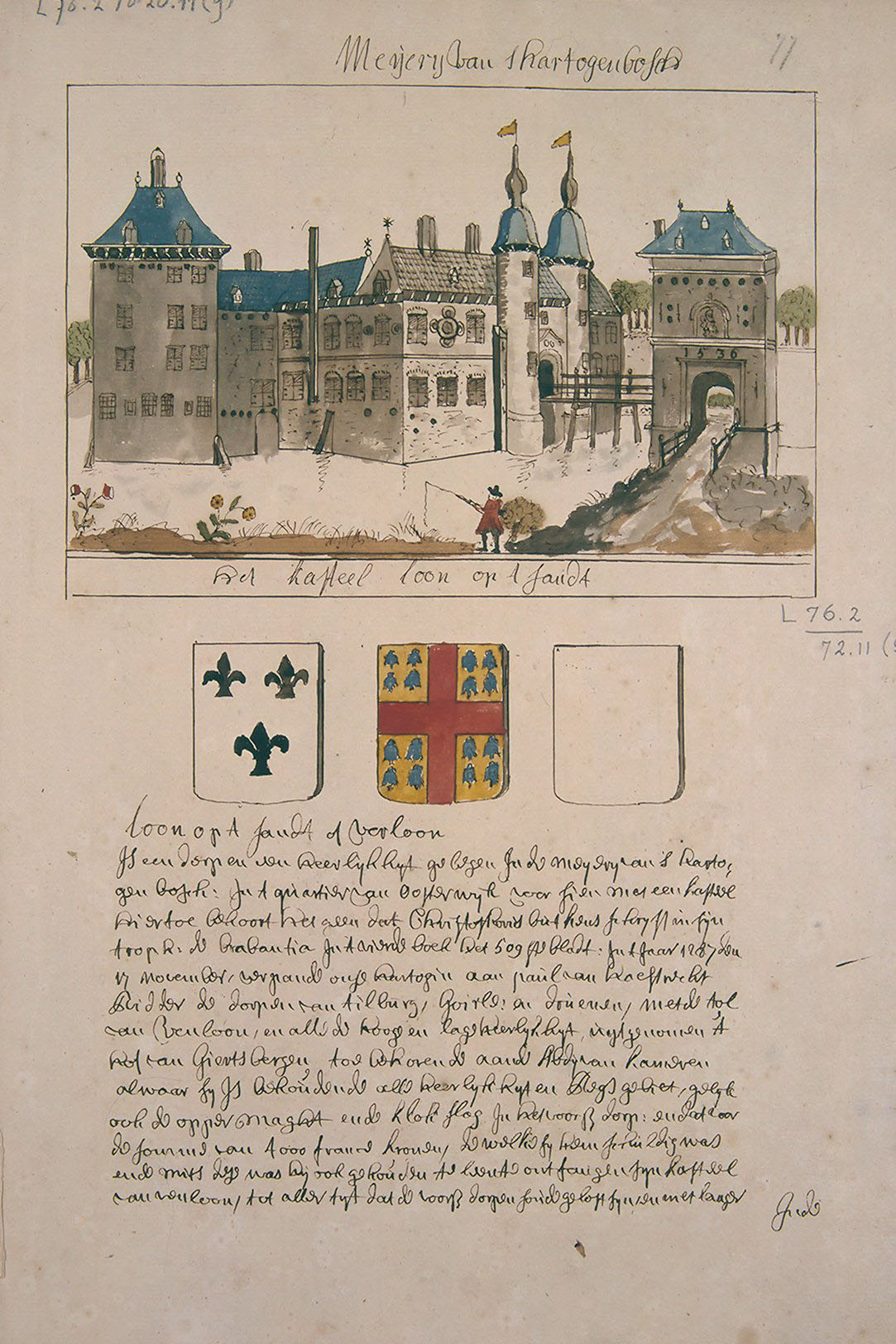
A drawing of c. 1710-1735

On 29 August 1383 Joanna, Duchess of Brabant granted the Lordship of Loon op Zand to Pauwels van Haastrecht schout of 's-Hertogenbosch after he had paid Sweder of Abcoude. Pauwels would build Loon op Zand Castle in 1383 or shortly after. It was (almost) ready by 1387, and would become his private property.

Pauwels would later side with the County of Holland against the Duchess. It led to a siege of the Castle. Whether the Loon op Zand Castle suffered any damage is not known.

Pauwels was succeeded first by his son Hendrick, married to Elsken van Dalem. Next came Willem, who had a son named Pauwels van Haastrecht, lord of Loon op Zand, Tilburg, Goirle and Drunen. This Pauwels married Catharina of Naaldwijk and had a son Dierick van Haestrecht (?-1492), who became Lord of Loon op Zand on 26 August 1473. With his wife Walburgis van de Poll he had two daughters: Diericke and Marie van Haastrecht.

=== The Van Grevenbroek family (1492?-1573) ===
In 1492 Loon op Zand came to Marie van Haastrecht (?-1535). She married Robbrecht van Grevenbroek (?-1528). Dierick of Grevenbroek succeeded to Loon op Zand after the death of his mother in 1535. Dierick married Philiberta of Immerseel (?-1603), who succeeded to Loon op Zand in accordance with his will in 1573. Dierick and Philiberta were probably responsible for large building activities on the outer bailey. They had a son Floris.

Floris van Grevenbroek married Cornelia van Harff in 1551. She was the heiress of Bokhoven Castle and Olmen. Floris was dead by 1559, and so Cornelia married Caspar van der Lip Lord of Blijenbeek and Afferden. With Caspar Cornelia van Harff had Josina van Grevenbroek heiress of Bokhoven and Olmen.

=== The Van Immerseel family (1573-1741) ===
==== The first Van Immerseel Lords of Loon op Zand (1573-1603) ====
In 1570 Josina van Grevenbroek married her nephew Engelbert of Immerseel. Together they had Philiberta of Immerseel and Dierick van Immerseel. Dierick was baptized 6 November 1572 in Antwerp. On 10 March 1573 he became Lord of Olmen, and on 20 December 1574 he became Lord of Bokhoven. On 5 August 1603 he would become Lord of Loon op Zand on the death of his great-grandmother Philiberta of Immerseel, who would keep Loon op Zand for the family the whole time.

==== Start of the Eighty Years' War ====
The Eighty Years' War had meanwhile started in 1568. Loon op Zand Castle became part of a front line that covered 's-Hertogenbosch, and in 1579 it got a garrison from that city. On 24 June 1587 the Dutch army under Philip of Hohenlohe-Neuenstein moved through the Langstraat, and bombarded Loon op Zand castle with 5 guns. The castle surrendered after a week long siege, with the keep suffering much damage. After the surrender the garrison begged for mercy. The captains were slaughtered, the soldiers taken prisoner, and the wives stripped naked. The latter then went to 's-Hertogenbosch with their children and told their story.

Hohenlohe next moved on to 's-Hertogenbosch, with the idea of forcing the Spanish to lift the Siege of Sluis (1587). Here he beat Claude de Berlaymont, and founded Fort Crèvecoeur to block communication between 's-Hertogenbosch and the Meuse. However, Hohenlohe's overall plan failed, and the Spanish side won the Siege of Sluis. On 30 July 1587 the Dutch garrison set the castle on fire and retreated, but in all probability the keep was still standing afterwards.

==== Fortress Loon op Zand ====
Peter Ernst I von Mansfeld-Vorderort now re-occupied Loon op Zand Castle for the Spanish side. On the vulnerable east and north side, it now got an earthen wall or rampart to protect it from cannon fire. Most of this wall is still present, even though it would have been higher at the time. On the current Klokkenlaan a sconce was built to protect the south-Eastern approaches.

The local population did not enjoy these times. As soon as somebody had baked bread, milked a cow, or made butter, the soldiers took everything. They cut down all cereals, and whoever resisted was killed. In September 1587 the city of 's-Hertogenbosch requested Alexander Farnese, Duke of Parma to occupy Loon op Zand Castle, the Sconce of Engelen, and other places with the soldiers that were in pay of the city and Meierij van 's-Hertogenbosch, instead of occupying these places with soldiers which were not paid. In 1590 the Dutch again besieged Loon op Zand, but now it stood firm.

==== The later Immerseel's (1603-1741) ====
As stated above Dierick van Immerseel become Lord of Loon op Zand on 5 August 1603. He married Maria of Renesse, lady of Haveluy. Dirk died in 1610, and Maria in 1622. They got at least five children, amongst these Engelbrecht and his sister Maria. Engelbrecht of Immerseel became Lord of Loon op Zand in 1610, and Lord of Bokhoven in 1619. In 1631 he inherited Itegem and Ter Hameijden from his deceased brother Frederik. From his grandfather Engelbert of Immerseel, married to Josina (cf. above) Engelbrecht got Immerseel Castle. He married Hélène de Montmorency, who died in 1648. Engelbrecht himself died in 1652. Engelbrecht and Hélène got a splendid monument in the church of Bokhoven.

The Lords of Loon op Zand allowed Catholics to attend mass in the castle chapel. Later the brewery on the castle grounds was made into a clandestine church. It served as such till 1823.

Theodor of Immerseel, son of Engelbrecht was the next lord. He died in 1654, and was succeeded by his brother Thomas Ignatius of Immerseel. Thomas became Lord of Immerseel in 1654, and of Bokhoven and Loon op Zand in 1657. In 1600 he married Madeleine Françoise de 't Serclaes de Tilly, daughter of Hélène's sister. Thomas died before 23 February 1677, Madeleine on 1 May 1684. Thomas would start a large renovation of the castle.

Ferdinand of Immerseel (?-1696), son of Thomas and Madeleine succeed to Loon op Zand in 1677. He was succeeded by his retarded brother Charles. When Charles died in 1741 his succession was contested.

=== Salm-Salm family (1753-1857) ===
In 1753 the succession was solved. Prince Louis Charles Otto of Salm-Salm (?-1778) descendant of Engelbrecht's sister Maria got Loon op Zand. Louis de Montmorency got Bokhoven.

From 1777 Louis Charles started a reconstruction of the castle, so it would look like a modern (i.e. eighteenth century) manor. He succeeded so well that generations of historians thought that the castle was demolished in 1777.

Prince Louis of Salm-Salm was succeeded by his nephew Constantine of Salm-Salm in 1778. Constantine was succeeded by Wilhelm Florenz in 1828, who married Flamine de Rossi. His sons Alfred, Emile and Felix would sell the castle in 1857.

=== Verheijen family (1857-1984) ===
In 1857 Sophia de Roy van Zuidewijn, widow of Franciscus Xaverus Verheijen bought the castle. The Verheyen family was raised to the Dutch nobility as jonkheer in 1831. From 1868 to 1898 Jan Baptist Verheijen lived in the castle. From 1898 to 1942 Eugène Verheyen, judge and member of the states-provincial of North Brabant. The final Vereyen on the castle was freule Emily Verheyen, who lived there 1942-1984 and married a Ten Horn, a physician. From 1977 J. Lemmens also came to live on the castle. He bought it in 1984.

=== Antiques dealer Van Dal (1985-2007) ===
In 1985 the castle was sold to J.J.A.M. van Dal. He was antiques dealer, who used the main building for his business and organized modern art exhibitions on the castle grounds. Van Dal sold the castle to W.P. de Pundert in 2007.

=== Mr. de Pundert (2007-2014) ===
In 2007 the rich Mr. de Pundert acquired the castle. He wanted to do a radical reconstruction, and threatened to let the castle decay if the municipality of Loon op Zand would not cooperate. The radical plans were not approved by the Rijksdienst voor het Cultureel Erfgoed, and also led to an occupation of the castle by angry inhabitants, and threats to squat it. De Pundert then agreed with some locals that he would give them the castle for free if they would found a foundation with a charitable status.

=== Stichting Het Witte Kasteel (2014-2020) ===
Next the Stichting (foundation) Het Witte Kasteel was founded to preserve the castle and to give it a useful purpose. The municipality aided the foundation with 100,000 Euro to start. With the help of about 60 volunteers and another 230,000 euro the foundation renovated the buildings and gardens. It is now an official location for weddings in the municipality. The auxiliary building on the sides of the courtyard are used by a restaurant and a Bed and Breakfast.
