= Altena Castle (Almkerk) =

Former castle in Almkerk

- Kasteel Altena
- Almkerk, the Netherlands
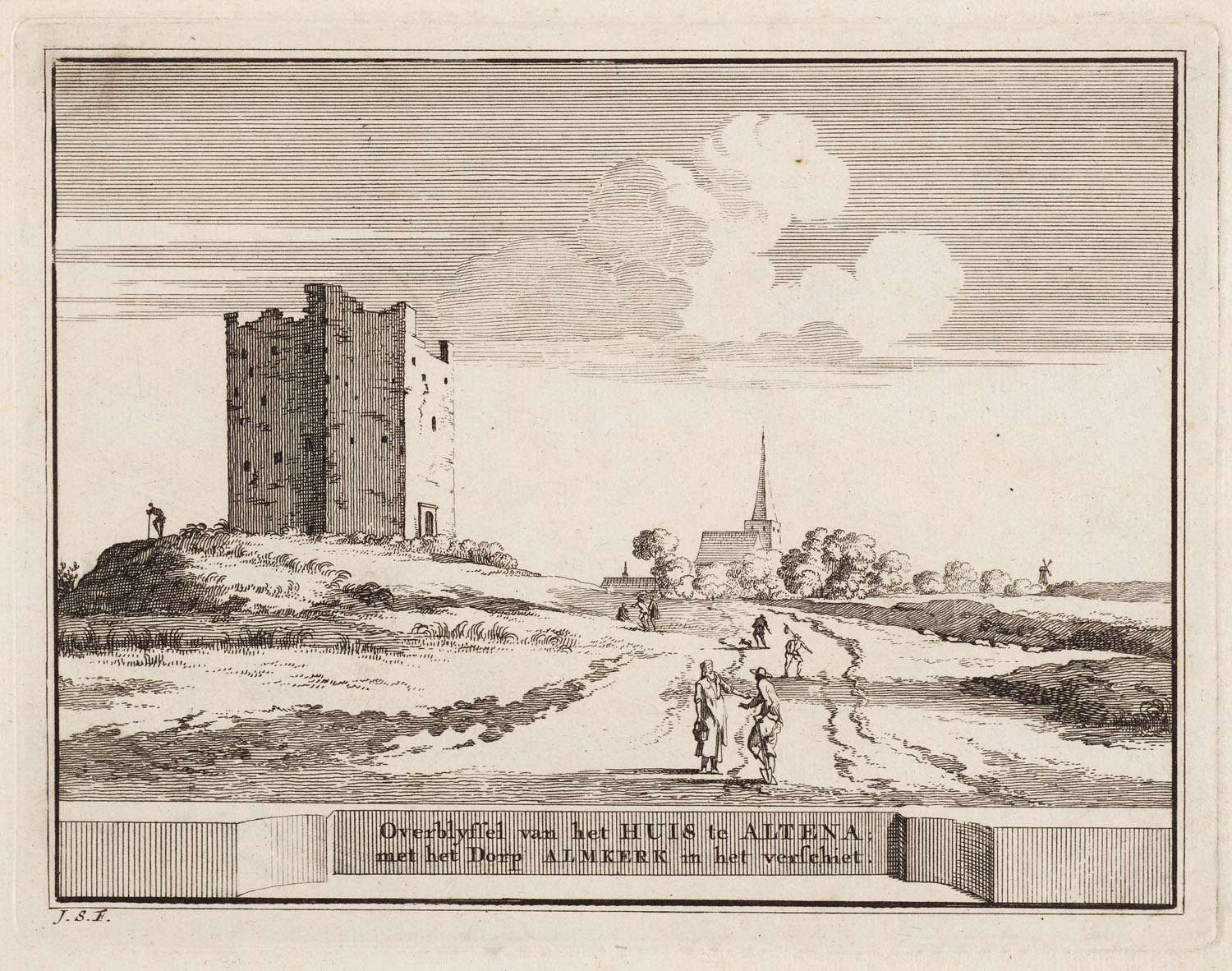
- Altena Castle by Jacobus Schijnvoet

Site information
- Type: Castle
- Condition: The motte remains

Location
- The Netherlands
- Coordinates: 51.774255°N 4.969414°E

Site history
- Built: 12th century
- Materials: tuff, brick
- Demolished: Main castle: c. 1400; Last tower:17th century

Altena Castle is a former castle in Almkerk. It was home to the lords of Altena, and often of the lords of Horne and Altena.

== Castle Characteristics ==
All that remains of Altena Castle is its clearly visible motte. Therefore, there can be little doubt that Altena Castle started out as a motte-and-bailey castle. During excavations a large amount of tuff stone was found. This indicates that Altena Castle was built before the procedure to produce brick was reinvented in the Netherlands. This reinvention took place in about 1200. The foundation date is estimated to be around 1150.

In time, motte-and-bailey castles were modernized. In 17th century pictures, the remains of the castle are depicted as a polygonal tower on a motte (see Schijnvoet's engraving). This is a somewhat unusual configuration for the Netherlands, where many motte-and-bailey castles were levelled to become circular water castles. Others became shell keeps by building a circular wall on top of the motte e.g. the Burcht van Leiden. Altena Castle was referred to as 'Tower and Castle', which can have different meanings, but implies that it consisted of two separate buildings.

The nearby Heusden castle might give inspiration about Altena's characteristics. Heusden Castle had its first octagonal tower founded on ground level, with the motte constructed around it. This tower was also made of stone, instead of brick.

== History ==
=== The first lords of Altena ===
The first known Lord of Altena was Dirk I, who appeared in writing in 1143. A Boudewijn van Altena was mentioned in 1200. He added the Lordship of Kortessem to Altena.

Altena Castle was mentioned by Melis Stoke (c. 1235 - 1305). He mentioned that in 1203, Louis II, Count of Loon visited Altena Castle, where he waited for the death of Dirk VII, Count of Holland, before continuing to Dordrecht to marry his daughter Ada, Countess of Holland. Altena Castle was first mentioned in a charter in 1230, when its lord Dirk of Altena paid homage to Floris IV, Count of Holland for his 'castrum' in Altena. Archaeological evidence (the presence of much tuff) proves that Dirk's forefathers already owned a motte castle at the current location.

=== The Lords of Horne and Altena ===
Dirk III of Altena had no legal offspring, his sister Sophia was his heir. Dirk succeeded in making his nephew Willem of Horne his heir and successor in the Lordship of Altena, which was a fief of Kleve. This was an achievement, because it could only be inherited by sons, not by brothers, and certainly not by nephews.

This was how Altena Castle came to the Lords of Horne. These succeeded each other without much incident until 1386.

=== First Siege of Altena Castle (1386) ===
In 1386 Willem VI of Horne was deposed by Albert of Bavaria regent of Holland, but Willem of Horne resisted. In May 1387 the Count of Holland and his son William of Oostervant then went to Woudrichem with a small army of 500 men. William of Oostervant was next declared Lord of Altena by force. He was then known as William of Oostervant and Horne.

At Altena Castle the troops of Willem VI resisted. A siege of the castle was led by lower ranking commanders of the Count of Holland. By 22 May 1387 a truce until mid-August had been concluded. The truce seems to have been of the type that the besieged would surrender if no help arrived before that date, but this is a guess. Soon after, William of Oostervant gained full control of Altena and its castle.

=== Rule by the Counts of Holland ===
In 1389 the official ruler William V of Holland, who had been locked since 1358, died. Regent Albert then became Count of Holland. In June 1388 he made Aleid van Poelgeest his official mistress. On the night of 22–23 September 1392 both she and William's chamberlain Willem Cuser, were murdered in The Hague by Hook nobles.

=== Second Siege of Altena Castle (1393) ===
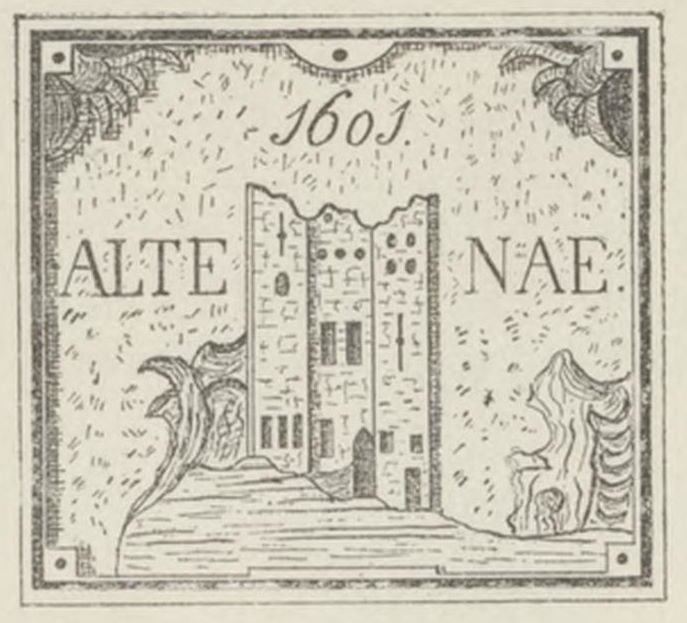
Depiction on a 1601 gable stone from Woudrichem

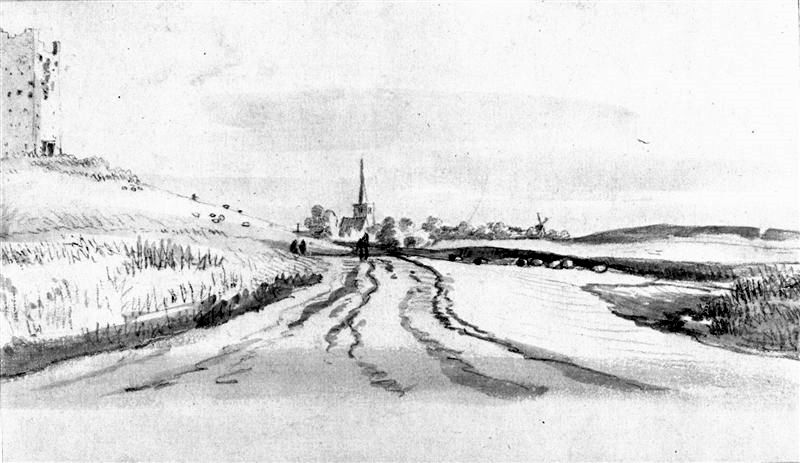
Ruins of Altena Castle near Almkerk, by Roelant Roghman, 1647

When Count Albert started to accuse a group of Hook nobles of the murder, he came into conflict with his son William. William and some of these nobles then left The Hague, and went to Altena Castle. In July 1393 Count Albert started to besiege Altena Castle with a small army. William had left some nobles with supplies in the castle, and went to 's-Hertogenbosch. The besiegers used artillery, and quickly succeeded in severely damaging the castle. On 20 July the castle surrendered on terms, the besieged leaving to 's-Hertogenbosch. Count William then demolished most of the castle, except the two big towers.

In 1396 William of Oostervant and his father were reconciled. In 1404 William of Oostervant succeeded his father as Count William VI of Holland.

=== Return of the Lords of Horne ===
Count William VI of Holland died on 31 May 1417. He was succeeded by his daughter Jacqueline, Countess of Hainaut. In order to gain support she granted Altena to Willem VII of Horne. In the subsequent succession war, Willem of Horne held on to Woudrichem. He probably did this to secure his own position. Altena Castle was probably not that relevant anymore, especially after Woudrichem got city walls.

=== The St. Elizabeth's flood (1421) ===
The St. Elizabeth's flood of 1421 had a profound effect on the Land of Altena, parts of which were flooded for decades. However the castle itself, and especially the big tower on the motte would not have washed away. Still, it might have suffered from delayed maintenance.

=== The Counts of Horne ===
Later in the fifteenth century, Jacob I of Horne became Count of Horne. In 1568 his successor Philip de Montmorency, Count of Horn was beheaded in Brussel. It marked the start of the Eighty Years' War (1568-1648). In 1589 the land of Altena was inundated, which cannot have been good for what was left of the castle. Soon after, Walburgis van Nieuwenaer widow of Philip de Montmorency, sold Altena to the province of Holland.

In 1620 a tower was reported to remain of Altena Castle. By 1660 the castle was ruinous. A contemporary description noted that its old decayed walls could still be seen. In the mid 18th century it was claimed that the last of the two ten-sided towers was demolished in 1678 or 1680.
