= Heeze Castle =

Castle in North Brabant, Netherlands

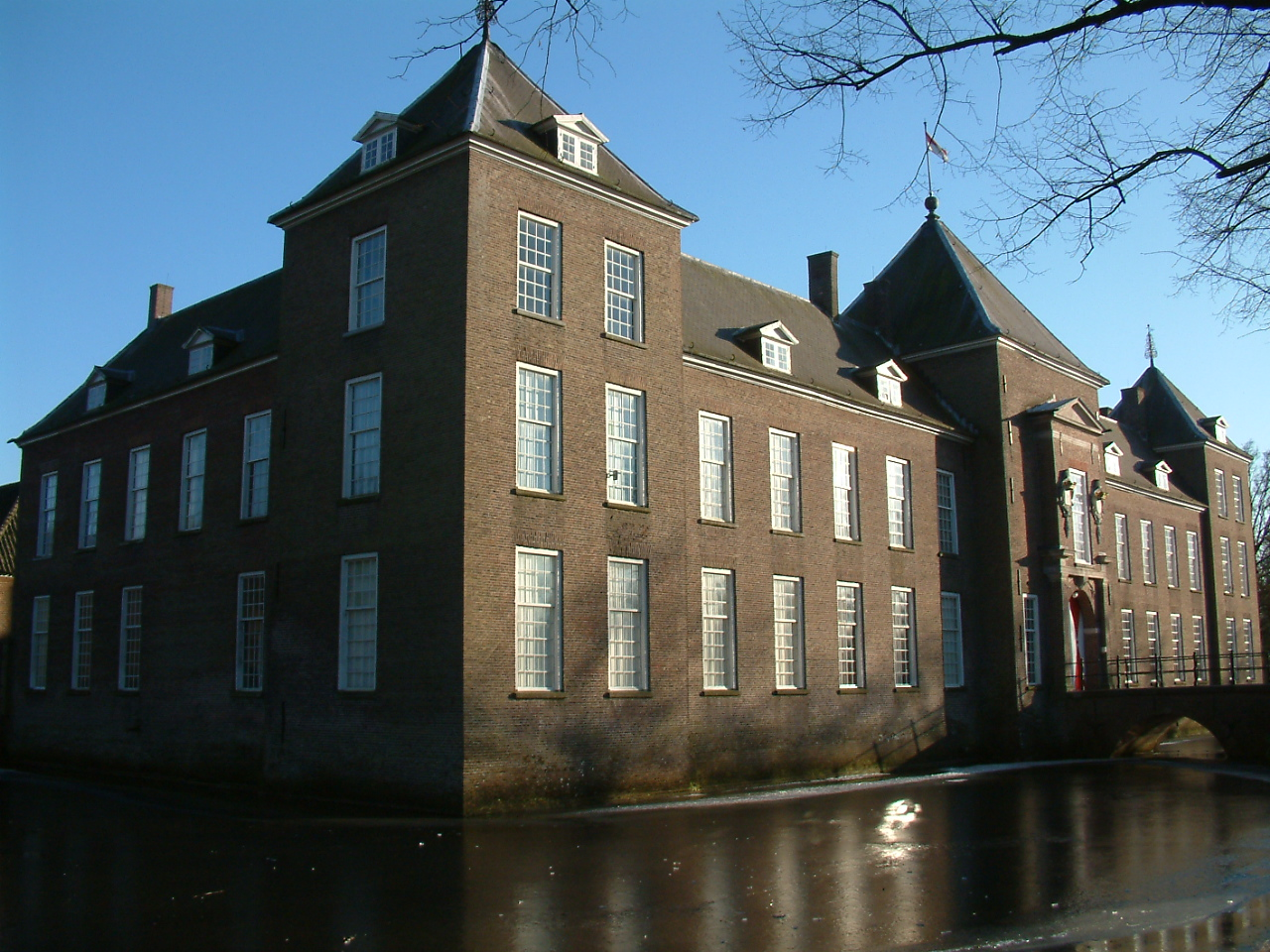
- Heeze Castle in 2003

Site information
- Type: Castle
- Owner: van Tuyll van Serooskerken family
- Open to the public: Yes, guided tours possible. 1 May - 30 September: Sunday: 14.00 and 15.00 hrs, Wednesday 14.00 hrs. 1 July - 31 August: Wednesday 15.00 hrs as well.
- Condition: Good

Location
- Location in the Netherlands
- Coordinates: 51.3812°N 5.5875°E

Site history
- Built: 1600
- Built by: Pieter Post
- Materials: Brick

Heeze Castle (Dutch: Kasteel Heeze) is situated in the Netherlands, south of Eindhoven. It used to be the centre of the seigneury of Heeze, Leende and Zesgehuchten, part of the Duchy of Brabant. In the Middle Ages, it was owned by the de Horne family. In the seventeenth Century Pieter Post designed a new castle, of which the first part was built in 1665. After Pieter Post died, the work was completed by his son Maurits Post.

Due to the rising costs of importing all building materials from other regions of the country, the build of the Post design was halted early and never finished. For this reason, the part of the castle that is used by the current owners was actually meant to be the servants' quarters. The biggest part of the castle was to be built behind the first courtyard.

In 1760 the castle was bought by Jan Maximiliaan van Tuyll van Serooskerken. The Van Tuyll van Serooskerken family has lived in the castle ever since.

== Eymerick Castle ==
At the east of the building of Heeze Castle within the waters is a part of an older castle situated Eymerick Castle. This castle was already in 1659 in a bad shape. Because the building-plans of Heeze Castle were never completed this part of the old castle is still there.

== See also ==
- List of castles in the Netherlands
