= May–June 1945 Dutch cabinet formation =

Formation of the Schermerhorn–Drees cabinet

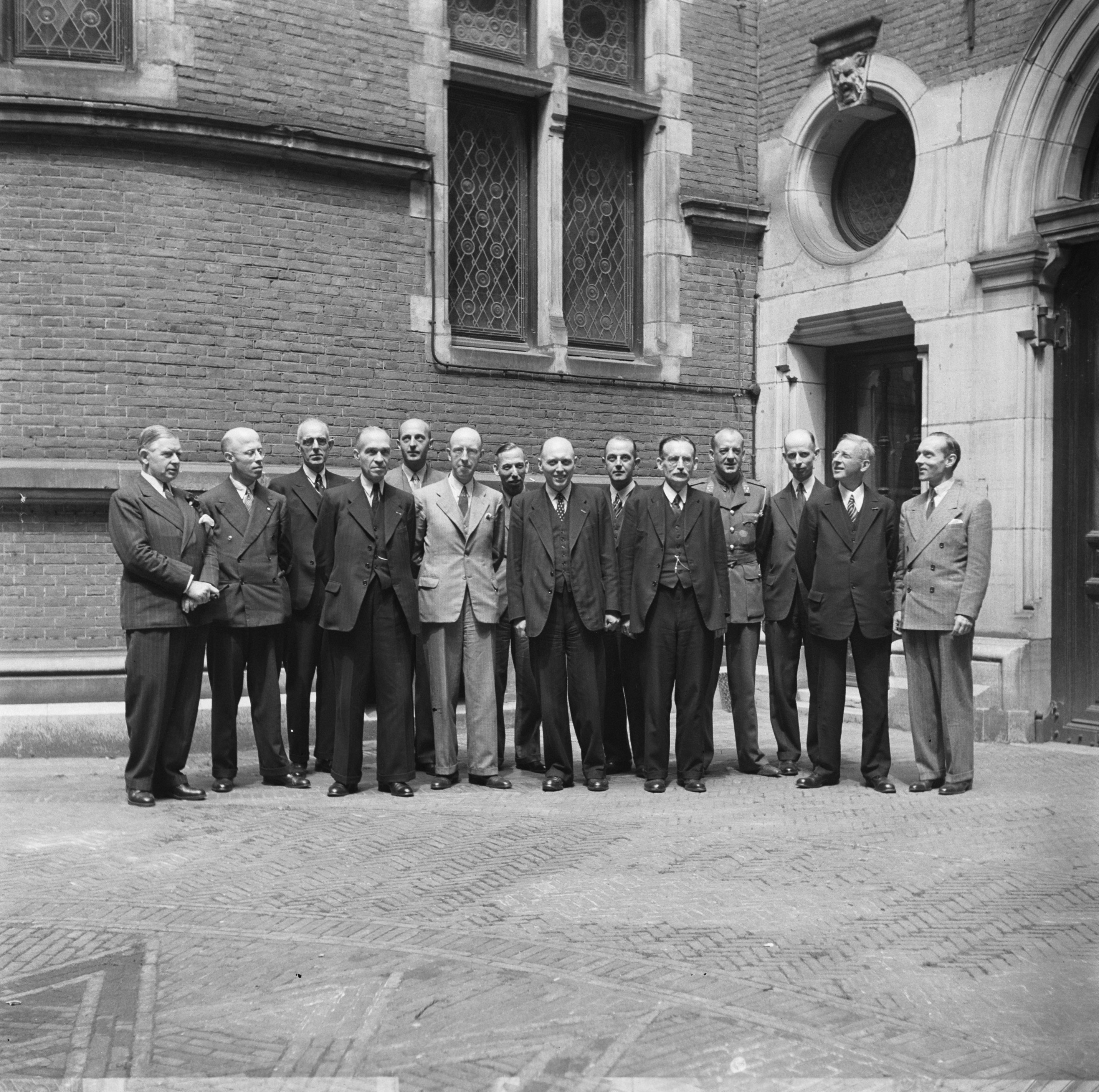
The Schermerhorn–Drees cabinet

A cabinet formation took place in the Netherlands after the third Gerbrandy cabinet resigned on 12 May 1945. On 25 June this resulted in the Schermerhorn–Drees cabinet. Because the formation took place shortly after the liberation from the German occupation, the formation deviated from the customs for cabinet formations.

== Background ==
On 12 May 1945, the Dutch government-in-exile Gerbrandy III, had offered their resignation after almost the entire Netherlands had been liberated from the German occupation. Daily management was placed in the hands of the Military Authority on behalf of the cabinet.

During the war, several groups had emerged that contemplated the political future of the Netherlands. There was the Political Convention, established in June 1940 as a meeting between the leaders of the six largest political parties. Additionally, there was the Vaderlands Comité (VC, lit. 'Fatherland Committee'), a group of representatives from political parties that advised the government in London on the future. A group of hostages in Kamp Sint-Michielsgestel laid the foundation for a renewal movement, also known as the breakthrough. The movement aimed to dismantle the pillarisation of Dutch politics. After the war, the Nederlandse Volksbeweging (NVB) was founded to achieve this goal.

=== States General ===
A key question was what should happen to the representative institutions, particularly the States General. Due to criticism of the pre-war functioning of the parliamentary system and the political parties, the cabinet, among others, opposed a return to the old composition. Additionally, the representativeness of the States General diminished as the occupation continued, and their importance was increasingly replaced by resistance groups.

In January 1945, the VC and Groote Advies-Commissie der Illegaliteit (GAC, lit. 'Great Advisory Commission of the Resistance') reached a compromise: the States General would return in its original composition. However, the vacant seats would not be filled based on the old candidate lists. Instead, candidates who had emerged during the occupation would be nominated to fill these positions.

== Consultations ==
On 10 May, Wilhelmina started the consultations on the Anneville estate. She first received Willem Schermerhorn as leader of the NVB and Lambertus Neher as a member of the College van Vertrouwensmannen. She asked them, among other things, whom she should consult to find out what was going on among the people. Above all, they advised approaching Willem Drees, parliamentary leader of the Social Democratic Workers' Party (SDAP), chairman of the Political Convention and member of the College van Vertrouwensmannen. In addition to Drees, she invited other members of the Political Convention and representatives of the Dutch resistance. The speakers of the Senate and the House of Representatives – normally advisors in a formation – and the parliamentary leader of the Roman Catholic State Party (RKSP) were not invited, because the queen did not want to emphasise representatives of pre-war politics.

On 27 May, the queen spoke with Drees. He advocated for as broad a base as possible for the cabinet, provided the parties could agree to a reconstruction programme. During the cabinet formation, consideration had to be given to the existing political parties, the NVB, and politically engaged resistance organisations. However, he explicitly did not want the leaders of the Nederlandsche Unie involved in the formation.

Little is known about most of the other consultations. Both Hendrik Tilanus, leader of the Christian Historical Union (CHU), and Sieuwert Bruins Slot, a prominent member of the Anti-Revolutionary Party (ARP) and editor-in-chief of Trouw, warned the queen against overestimating the sense of unity in the country, as articulated by the NVB. Tilanus recommended Jan Donner as the formateur. ARP leader Bram Rutgers also recommended Donner, followed by Drees. The vice-president of the Council of State, Frans Beelaerts van Blokland, recommended Schermerhorn and Drees jointly.

On 28 May, the queen invited Drees and Schermerhorn together. From the consultations she understood that she had to choose between them to be a formateur; Drees as representative of the political parties and Schermerhorn as recommended by the resistance groups. Because she could not make a choice, she asked if they wanted to become a joint formateur, to which they agreed.

== Formateurs Drees and Schermerhorn ==
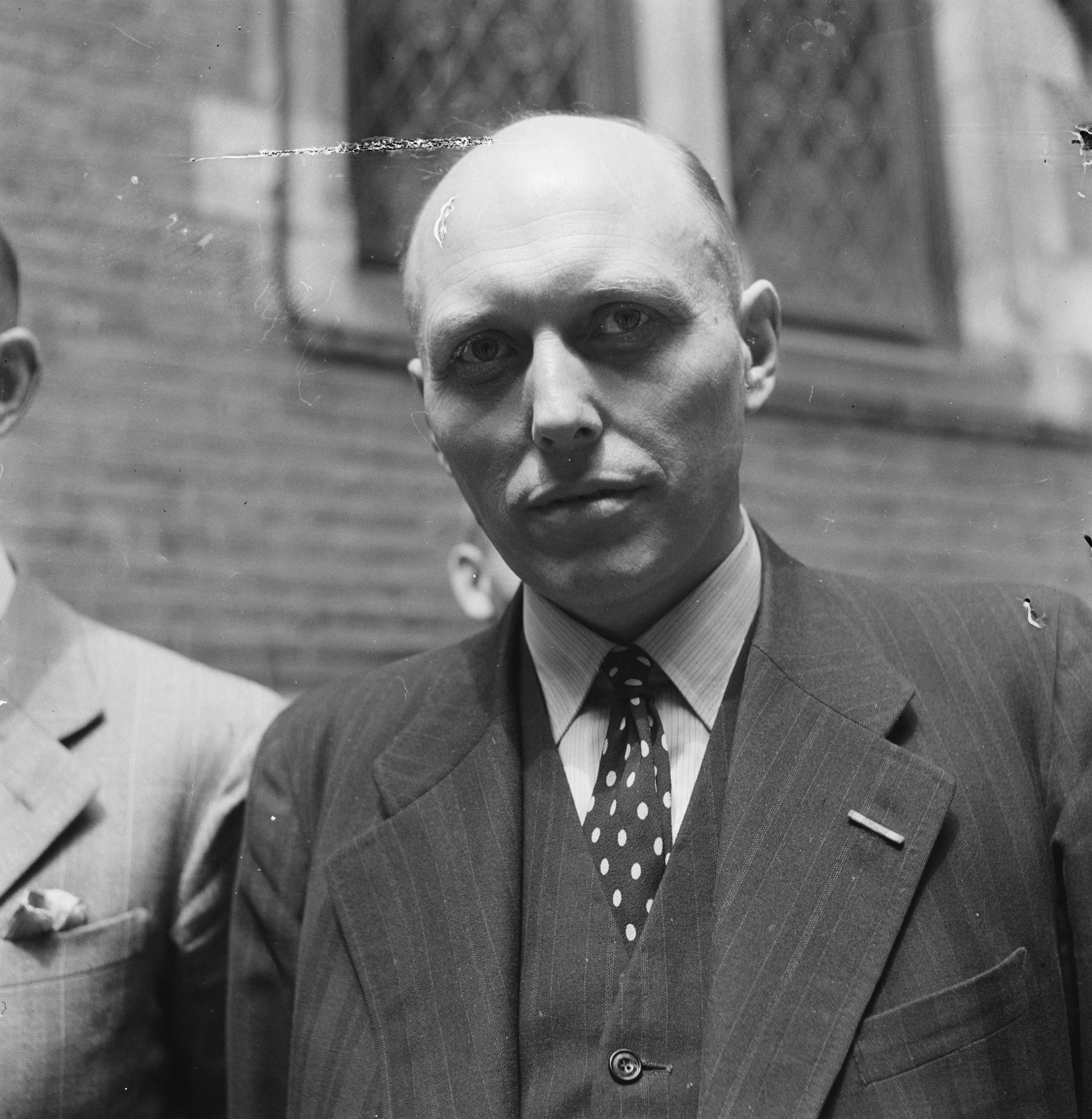
Formateur Wim Schermerhorn, 24 June 1945

The assignment was to form a "national cabinet for recovery and renewal." The formateurs quickly agreed that Schermerhorn would become Prime Minister and Drees Minister of Social Affairs. They took the compromise regarding the States-General as their starting point, supplemented by the agreement that the non-replenished States General would first have to approve the proposal.

To form a national cabinet, they first approached the ARP, specifically Donner, who had also been a member of the VC. He referred them to the political leaders from before 1940; Jan Schouten and Jacob Adriaan de Wilde. These two had not been involved in the compromise regarding the new States General and were opposed to it. Schouten received support from the majority of the ARP parliamentary group.

After this unsuccessful consultation, Drees and Schermerhorn decided to no longer engage with party leaders who had not participated in discussions during the occupation. They offered Donner the position of minister of Justice, but he declined out of loyalty to his party and to focus on restoring the Supreme Court.

Due to the ongoing Pacific War, continuity in some departments was deemed essential. Therefore, Eelco van Kleffens (Foreign Affairs) and Jim de Booy (Navy) remained in their positions. Instead of Jan de Quay, the Minister of War – who was not asked due to his leadership of the Nederlandsche Unie – his secretary-general, Jo Meynen, was approached. After some hesitation, he agreed, but explicitly not as a representative of the ARP, of which he was a member. Additionally, Herman van Roijen was appointed as a minister without portfolio to assist with Foreign Affairs.

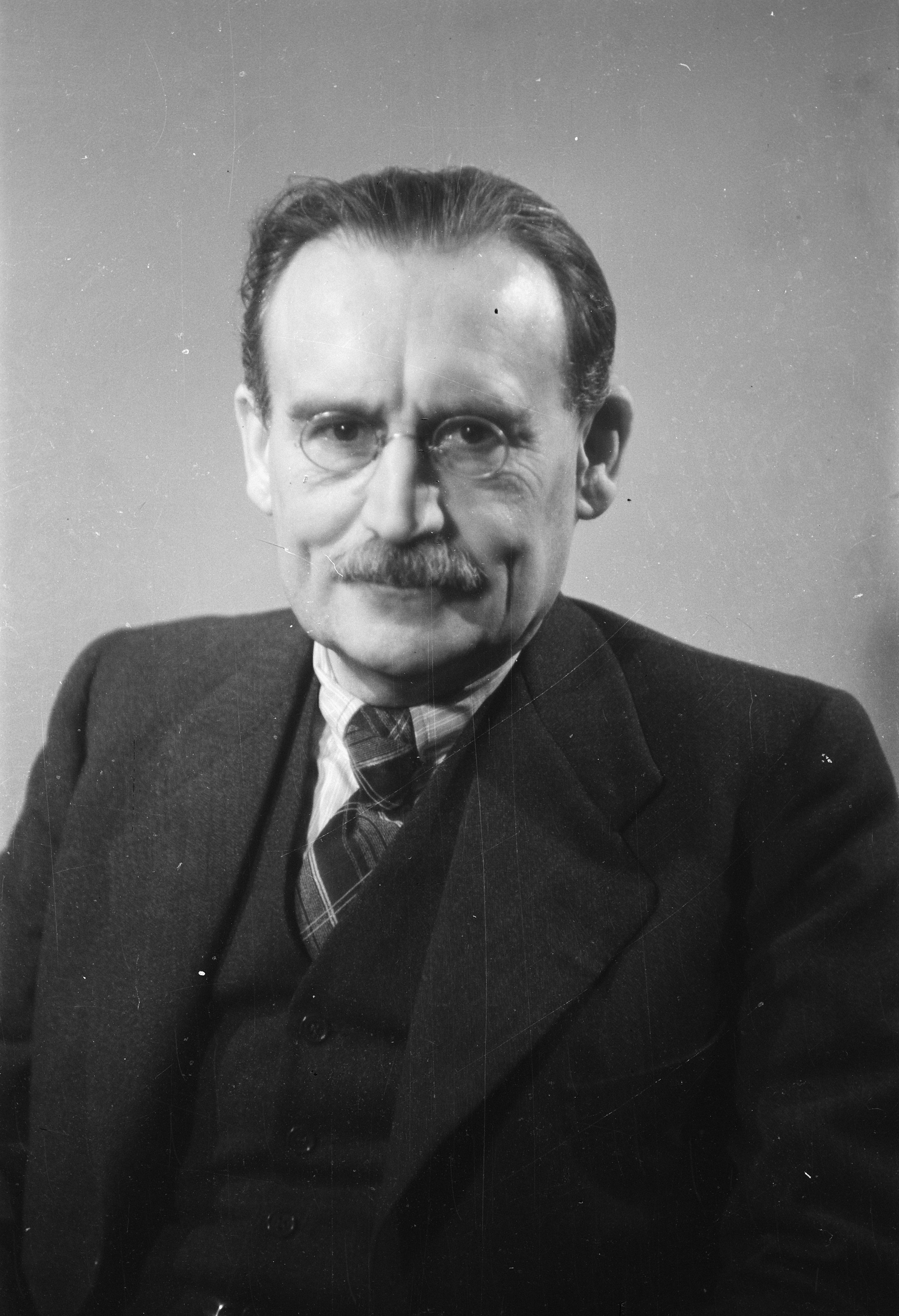
Formateur Willem Drees, February 1946

Arnold Jan d'Ailly was first approached as minister of Finance, but when the formateurs learned that Piet Lieftinck was available, they convinced D'Ailly to step aside.

Due to the significant role of communists in the resistance, the formateurs approached representatives of Vrienden van de Waarheid, Gerben Wagenaar and Paul de Groot. However, the formateurs only offered them two ministerial positions without portfolio, which they refused. De Groot also disagreed with the timing of the elections and the lenient penalties for collaborators.

Bruins Slot was approached to get a proper representative of the ARP in the cabinet. He declined for three reasons. He was against a national radio broadcaster and the elections had to be scheduled earlier. Finally, he wanted an antirevolutionary minister of Education. This position had however already been offered to Gerardus van der Leeuw.

Willem Michiels van Kessenich was selected as Minister of the Interior. However, the formateurs learned there were questions about Michiels van Kessenich's actions as mayor of Maastricht, particularly when a German commander had asked him to compile a list of hostages. As minister, Michiels van Kessenich would have been responsible for the purging of mayors. Since they did not have time to investigate the matter further, they withdrew the invitation. Instead, they asked the incumbent minister, Louis Beel, on 23 June to remain in office.

With Beel accepting on 24 June, the cabinet was complete and the ministers were appointed the same day. A day later, the new ministers were sworn in.

== Sources ==
- Duynstee, F.J.F.M.; Bosmans, J. (1977). Het Kabinet Schermerhorn-Drees (in Dutch). Assen/Amsterdam: Van Gorcum. hdl:2066/158343. ISBN 90-232-1412-9.
