= Gymnasium Beekvliet =

Coordinates: 51.6421°N 5.3646°E

Gymnasium Beekvliet is a Catholic independent grammar school (Gymnasium) in Sint-Michielsgestel, The Netherlands. It enrolled 784 students in the 2019–2020 academic year.

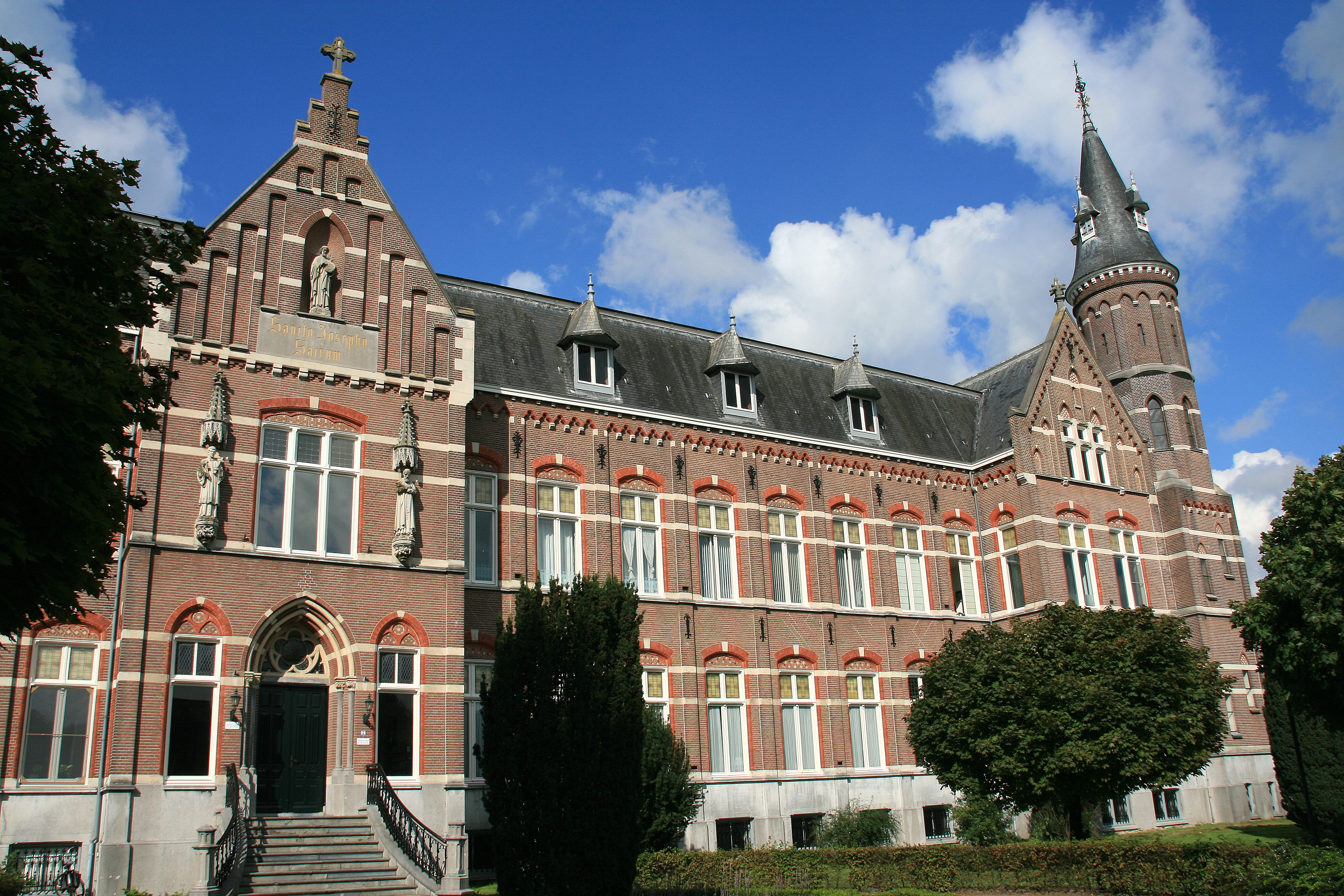
Sint Michielsgestel - Seminarielaan 16 - Seminarie Beekvliet

== History ==
Today's "Gymnasium Beekvliet" originated from the episcopal seminary and boarding school Beekvliet. "Kleinseminarie Beekvliet" was founded in Sint-Michielsgestel in 1815.

Former alumni include:

- Christian Hoecken - missionary in the USA (1808-1851)
- Adrian Hoecken - missionary in the USA (1815-1897)
- Peter Donders - missionary in Surinam (1809-1887)
- Francis Janssens - archbishop of New Orleans (1843-1897)
- Floris van der Putt - priest and composer (1915-1990)
- Maurice Pirenne - priest and composer (1928-2008)
- Tim Janssen - Rector magnificus DTU (1969)

=== Kamp Sint-Michielsgestel ===
During World War II it was used as an internment camp, same as the seminary in Haaren. On May 4, 1942 460 Dutch men were imprisoned at Beekvliet. Among the detainees, discussions started to take place about the renewal of social relationships in the Netherlands and the abolition of the "pillarisation". Among others Simon Vestdijk and Anton van Duinkerken participated in these discussions. Interned political and well-known figures included Wim Schermerhorn (the Netherlands' first Prime Minister after World War II), Willem Banning, Pieter Geyl, Niko Tinbergen, Hendrik Brugmans, Hendrik Algra, Marinus van der Goes van Naters, and Jan de Quay. Beekvliet was an internment camp for politically active and influential Dutch civilians. Several detainees were executed by the Germans on August 15, 1942 and October 16, 1942, as reprisals for actions by the resistance in other parts of the country.

After the seminary closed in 1972, the gymnasium was continued with students from throughout the region. The Duitse Bouw ("German Building") where the detainees were held during WW-II was used as a gymnasium until 1978. After that, the school moved to a new building directly across the Beekvlietstraat. Today "Gymnasium Beekvliet" is an independent gymnasium with just over 800 students. Beekvliet celebrated its 190th anniversary in 2005.

The old Beekvliet buildings were mostly demolished and covered an area that is now surrounded by the following streets: Spijt - Beekgraaf - Krommeweg - Beekvlietstraat - Seminarielaan - Schijndelseweg. Only the tower and a part of the main building survived. The orchard, sports fields, botanical garden and the buildings were replaced by a new community.

== Timeline ==
- 1815 Beekvliet founded
- 1942 Used as internment camp by the German occupier; expanded with the Duitse Bouw
- 1972 Seminary closed; the gymnasium continues in the Duitse Bouw
- 1978 Move to the new building at the Beekvlietstraat 4
- 1992 Monument for those executed in 1942 is revealed
- 1995 First expansion added to the building at the Beekvlietstraat 4
- 2002 Second expansion added to the building at the Beekvlietstraat 4
