= Willem Banning =

Dutch theologian and politician

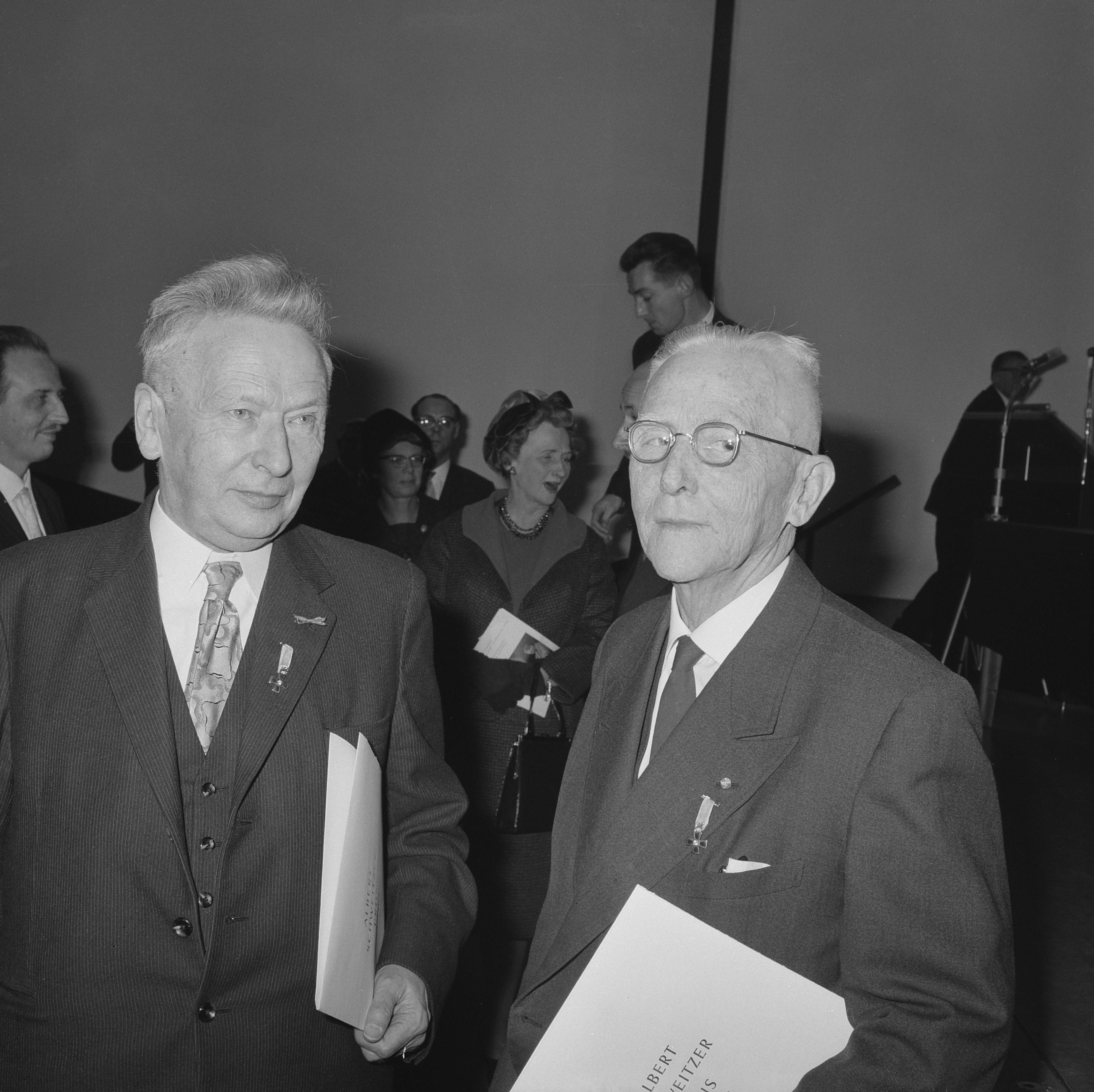
- Willem Banning (left) awarded Albert Schweitzer prize 1963
- Born: 21 February 1888; Makkum, Netherlands
- Died: 6 January 1971 (aged 82); Driebergen, Netherlands
- Occupations: Theologian, Philosopher, Sociologist, Politician
- Political party: Labour Party
- Spouse: Henriëtta Johanna Wilhelmina Schoemaker
- Children: 3 daughters
- Parent(s): Jan Banning; Aafke Canrinus

Willem Banning (21 February 1888 in Makkum – 7 January 1971 in Driebergen) was a Dutch theologian, philosopher, sociologist and politician, who played an important role in Dutch 20th-century politics.

== Personal life ==
Banning was born the son of Jan Banning, a herring fisherman, and Aafke Canrinus.

Thanks to his school teacher in elementary school he was able to attend a teachers college (Rijksnormaalschool) in Haarlem, where he received his teachers certificate in 1907. During his study he became involved in the movement to politically organise the college students, and in publishing a periodical, the Kweekelingenbode, of which he became the editor in 1908. He was also active in the Kweekelingen Geheelonthoudersbond (a temperance society). He was hired as a home teacher by a Hoorn notary public to educate his son in the years 1907-1909. During this period he came under the influence of a local clergyman with socialist sympathies, J. Th. Tenthoff, who introduced him to the circle around the Christian Socialist periodical De Blijde Wereld. He also met his future wife, the teacher Henriëtta Johanna Wilhelmina Schoemaker, whom he married on 9 October 1915. They had three daughters. After a few stints as an elementary-school teacher in the period 1909-1911 his former employer enabled him financially to prepare for the Staatsexamen. (Note: the Dutch government examination that substituted for the final high-school examination for non-high-school students, and authorised entry into a university study) He started his studies in theology at Leiden university in 1913. There he was a student of P.D. Chantepie de la Sausaye and K.H. Roessingh.

== Early career ==
Banning had not been politically active before the outbreak of the First World War, but that event motivated him and his future wife to start studying the works of Karl Marx and Karl Kautsky, as he blamed capitalism for the war. He also became a member of the SDAP in 1914.

In 1917 (still a student at Leiden) he was appointed predikant (minister) of the congregation of the Dutch Reformed Church in Borculo. In 1920 he became the minister of the Sneek congregation as successor of the Christian-socialist G. Horreüs de Haas. Meanwhile, in 1916 he and his wife had come in contact with a Dutch group of alumni of the Woodbrooke Quaker Study Centre. This group formed the Arbeidsgemeenschap der Woodbrookers (Labor community of Woodbrooke alumni) in 1919 of which Banning became chairman. The main aim of the Woodbrookers was to form a link between Socialism and Christianity. Because of his contacts in both the SDAP and the world of Christian socialists Banning soon became the main spokesman of the latter group within the SDAP.

In 1928 he resigned his position as minister and took up his theological studies again. In 1929 he received his Doctorandus degree in theology from Leiden University and started work on a dissertation. In 1931 he published that dissertation about the philosophy of the French Socialist Jean Jaures, entitled Jaures als denker (Jaures as thinker).

== Political career ==
In 1929 Banning had been appointed executive director of the Woodbrookers society. He also organised a Congress of Christian socialists in this period that attracted 600 participants. The leadership of the SDAP was keen to encourage this development and Banning was elected a member of the party's governing body in 1931, and of its executive committee in 1935. In this period he was instrumental in developing a constitutional programme of the SDAP, published in 1935 under the title Het staatkundig stelsel der sociaal-democratie (The constitutional system of social-democracy), and of a new political manifest of the party that was adopted at the 1937 Congress. However, he resigned from the executive committee in protest of the decision to formally abolish the party's pacifist stance in 1937, in reaction to the rise of Nazism as a force that threatened Dutch democracy. (Note: Banning was a principled pacifist who rejected the Nazi ideology, but could not in good conscience support a re-armament policy; Hartmans, Banning) He remained a member of the governing body until 1939 when he became editor of the party's ideological publication Socialisme en Democratie (Socialism and Democracy).

After the German invasion of the Netherlands in 1940 the German occupation authorities soon made his work impossible, also because he published a number of anti-German pamphlets. In 1942 he was arrested and interned as a hostage in the Gymnasium Beekvliet in Kamp Sint-Michielsgestel, together with a number of other prominent Dutchmen. This group of anti-Nazi politicians used their internment to plan a political reform of the Dutch party system for the post-war period. The pre-war system was characterised as a system of Pillarisation that fragmented the Dutch political landscape. The internees resolved to bring an end to this fragmentation.

Immediately after Liberation in 1945 Banning, together with a number of other politicians of different parties, such as Willem Schermerhorn, Piet Lieftinck, Jan de Quay, E.M.J.A. Sassen, and Hendrik Brugmans, formed the Nederlandse Volksbeweging as a movement to bring about what was called the Doorbraak (Breakthrough) of the Pillarisation system. This movement was a main force in bringing about the fusion of the SDAP with two other pre-war political parties, the Free-thinking Democratic League and the Christian Democratic Union, to form the Labour Party (PvdA). Banning was chairman of the founding Congress of this party on 9 February 1946, and he also gave the main address.

Though the hoped for doorbraak did not take place, the PvdA played a major role in the post-war part of Dutch 20th-century political history, and Banning for a while became its "house ideologue" as editor of Socialisme en Democratie. He coordinated the formulation of several of the PvdA's political manifests in 1947 and 1959, and drafted the official reaction of the party to the Dutch bishops' 1954 advice to Dutch Roman Catholics to vote for the Catholic People's Party.

== Academic career ==
Already during his internment in the Second World War Banning, under the influence of his fellow hostage Brugmans, had become interested in the philosophy of personalism, as developed by the circle around the French literary periodical Esprit. He wrote a book that he published after the war under the title De dag van morgen. Schets van een personalistisch socialisme, richtpunt voor de vernieuwing van ons volksleven (The day of tomorrow. Design of a personalistic socialism, target for the renewal of our popular life) in which his own version of this philosophy was expounded. He also took the initiative to the foundation of an institute for the promotion of the renewal of the Dutch Reformed Church that received the name Kerk en Wereld (Church and World); he became its director for many years. He also was appointed in a chair for Sociology of Religion at Leiden University.

Declining health forced him to resign many of his functions after 1958. The last ten years of his life he drifted into an isolated position. He died on 6 January 1971 in Driebergen.

== Other works ==
- W. Banning (1998). H.E.S. Woldringh (ed.). Hedendaagse sociale bewegingen: achtergronden en beginselen (1938) (in Dutch) (13 ed.). Houten: Bohn Stafleu Van Loghum. ISBN 90-313-2673-9.
- Karl Marx: leven, leer en betekenis(1960) (in Dutch) (14 ed.). Utrecht: Het Spectrum. 1977. ISBN 90-274-4825-6.
- Handboek pastorale sociologie, 7 delen (1953-1962) (in Dutch). 's-Gravenhage: Boekencentrum.
- Kompas: een toelichting op het Beginselprogramma van de Partij van de Arbeid (in Dutch). Amsterdam: Partij van de Arbeid. 1947.

== Notes and references ==
=== Further reading ===
- Molendijk, Arie L. "Willem Banning and the Reform of Socialism in the Netherlands." Contemporary European History (2020) : 1-16 DOI: https://doi.org/10.1017/S096077732000003X
- Bomhoff-van Rijn, M.L (1988). Banning als denker (in Dutch). Utrecht: De Ploeg. ISBN 90-6584-051-6.
- Rob Hartmans. "Banning, Willem". Biografisch woordenboek van het socialisme en de arbeidersbeweging in Nederland (in Dutch). hdl:10622/594774F2-E5A7-4022-A1E8-C48B7A722903.
- Wirdum-Banning, H. van (1988). Willem Banning, 1888-1971: leven en werken van een religieus socialist (in Dutch). Amersfoort: De Horstink. ISBN 90-6184-336-7.
- H. Zunneberg (1989). "Banning, Willem (1888-1971), in:Biografisch Woordenboek van Nederland, vol.3". Huyghens KNAW (in Dutch).
