= Nederlandse Volksbeweging =

Dutch political reform movement (1945–1951)

The Nederlandse Volksbeweging (NVB, English: "Dutch People's Movement") was a political reform movement established in the Netherlands in 1945, immediately after the Second World War.

The idea to found the movement originated during the war in a group of prominent Dutchmen who had been interned as hostages by the German occupation authorities in Kamp Sint-Michielsgestel in 1942. Many of them would later occupy prominent positions in Dutch political and social life, like future prime-ministers Willem Schermerhorn and Jan de Quay, academics Pieter Geyl, Nikolaas Tinbergen and Hendrik Brugmans, and politicians Willem Banning and Marinus van der Goes van Naters.

With ideologies such as fascism and communism permanently excluded from Dutch politics, the NVB was intended to renew the political landscape in the Netherlands. A breakthrough would have to occur in the pillarized political landscape: politics was no longer dominated by the opposition between Christian and secular parties (the so-called Antithesis). These ideas led to the fusion of three pre-war political parties: the SDAP, the VDB and the CDU into the new PvdA. The founding Congress of this new party was chaired by Willem Banning, a prominent member of the NVB.

The NVB was disbanded in 1951.
