= Nederlandsche Unie =

Netherlands Union Nederlandsche Unie
- Founded: 24 July 1940
- Dissolved: 6 May 1941
- Headquarters: Amsterdam
- Newspaper: De Unie
- Ideology: Dutch nationalism Accommodation with Germany; Acceptance of the New Order; Authoritarianism; Corporatism; Doorbraak
- Political position: Right-wing to far-right

The Netherlands Union (Dutch: Nederlandsche Unie) was a short-lived political movement active in the German-occupied Netherlands in World War II. In its brief period of activity between July 1940 and May 1941, up to 800,000 Dutch people became members, which was about a tenth of the population at the time. It represented the largest political movement in the history of the Netherlands.

== Foundation and goals ==
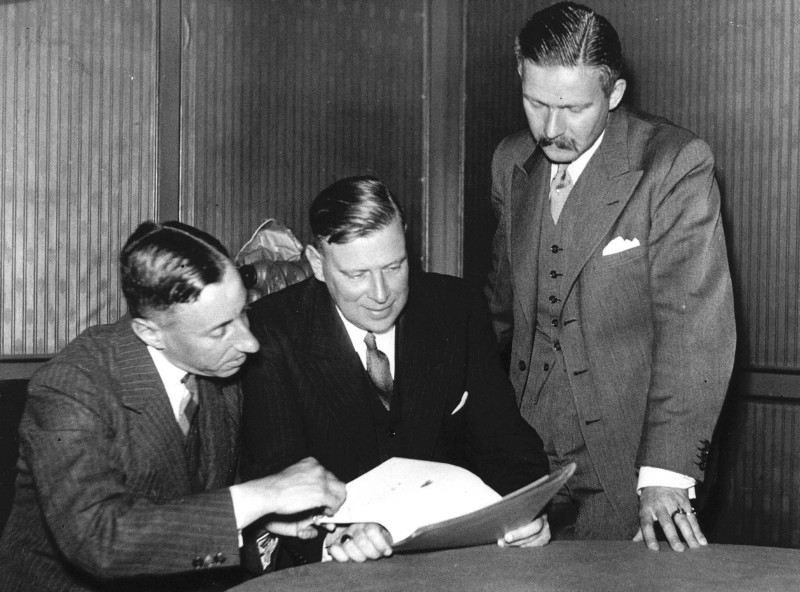
The Netherlands Union's founders. From left to right: Jan de Quay, Louis Einthoven and Johannes Linthorst Homan

The Netherlands Union was founded on 24 July 1940 only a few weeks after the completion of the German invasion of the Netherlands. It was created by Dr Louis Einthoven who had been Chief of Police in Rotterdam, Johannes Linthorst Homan who had been Queen's Commissioner in Groningen, and Professor Jan de Quay who had been part of the Roman Catholic State Party. On the day of its founding, the three circulated a manifesto setting out the goals of the movement. It called on the Dutch to accommodate themselves to the new political reality of the German occupation and promoted "a loyal attitude of towards the occupying power" in the interests of a wider moral and political regeneration of Dutch society. It has been compared with the programme of the early Vichy regime in France.

The background was the conviction of the three founders that the Dutch culture and way of life could only be preserved through a policy of accommodation and limited collaboration with the Germans. Furthermore, they wanted a more moderate alternative to the openly fascist National Socialist Movement in the Netherlands (Nationaal-Socialistische Beweging in Nederland, NSB) and prevent that this would transfer all political power through the German leadership. The NSB and the Germans should not alone be able to determine the future of the Netherlands.

== Organization and work ==
"[The Netherlands Union's] success was due to a misconception on both sides. The Germans mistook it for a collaborationist party, the Dutch for a patriotic rally. When it turned out to be neither, the Dutch deserted it and the Germans suppressed it. It was just sufficiently collaborationist to annoy true patriots [..] and was sufficiently independent to annoy the Germans [...]."

— David Littlejohn, historian.

The Nederlandsche Unie was very well received by the population, with around 200,000 members within a week. It claimed to have gained 800,000 members at its peak in February 1941. This enormous popularity, however, had less to do with the program and the goals of the movement itself than with the feeling of protesting against the National Socialist Movement (and thus indirectly against the German occupiers) by joining the Unie. In order to organize this high number of members, the division into dozen regional districts was necessary, which in turn were locally divided into district groups.

The general agenda of the Nederlandsche Unie included a stronger community spirit, an “organic further development of society” and the obligation to work for everyone. In addition, people committed to freedom of religion and freedom of belief. Despite the protest attitude of many members, the leadership of the Nederlandschen Unie basically stuck to a constructive cooperation with the Germans. For example, Unie made donations to the German-sponsored Winter Relief charity. This attitude led to criticism from the Dutch Resistance, who saw its efforts undermined by the Nederlandsche Unie. Furthermore, the Unie was loyal to the exiled Dutch royal family Orange, which led to tensions with the German administration. After the start of Operation Barbarossa, the German attack on the Soviet Union, the occupiers expected a pro-German mood in the political organizations they tolerated in the Netherlands, which, however, largely failed to materialize among the members of the Unie.

=== De Unie ===
The weekly paper De Unie (The Union) was published by the Nederlandsche Unie as the official organ of the movement. The first edition appeared on August 24, 1940 with a circulation of 135,000 copies, while the tenth edition has already been printed 250,000 times. By the spring of 1941 the paper had a circulation of around 400,000 copies, of which 60,000 were sent directly to subscribers. The editor-in-chief of the newspaper was the journalist Geert Ruygers.

== Attitude towards Anti-Semitism ==
The leadership of the Nederlandsche Unie took the position from the beginning that a regulation on the status of Jews who immigrated to the Netherlands before and during the war was necessary. What kind of this regulation should be, however, remained unclear. However, native Dutch people of the Jewish faith were expressly accepted, who were not seen as a threat to Dutch culture by the Nederlandsche Unie. Einthoven, de Quay and Linthorst Homan emphasized that these fellow citizens must be treated with tolerance and respect.

It was therefore also possible for Jews to become members of the Nederlandsche Unie. Nevertheless, the leadership was well aware of the importance that the German occupiers attached to the "Jewish Question". For example, the three founders asked Lodewijk Ernst Visser, the chairman of the Joodsche Coördinatie Commissie and influential member of the Jewish community, recommending Dutch Jews to retire from public office. Visser flatly refused this request. An active exclusion of Jewish members from the Nederlandsche Unie did not take place at any time.

== Prohibition ==
The Netherlands Union refused to endorse the German invasion of the Soviet Union in June 1941 on the basis that this would mean a position hostile to the United Kingdom. As a result of this, the German authorities became significantly more hostile to the movement. An article appeared in De Unie in July 1941, in which the leadership clearly distanced itself from Nazism and called for the national sovereignty of the Netherlands. Only then could the Dutch people participate in the "war against Bolshevism". The appearance of this article led to various reprisals on the part of the occupying powers: In addition to a ban on assembly and a fine of 60,000 guilders, the distribution of De Unie was also prohibited. This was followed by a ban on all activities on August 31, 1941 and then the dissolution of the organization at the end of the year by Arthur Seyß-Inquart, the Reich Commissioner for the Netherlands.

After the dissolution of the movement, the founding trio were arrested and detained in the internment camp at Sint-Michielsgestel. In particular, the later Prime Minister de Quay stood out as a member of a group of men, the so-called Heeren Zeventien (lit. 'Seventeen Gentlemen').
