= Max Kohnstamm =

Dutch historian and diplomat (1914–2010)

Max Kohnstamm OMRI
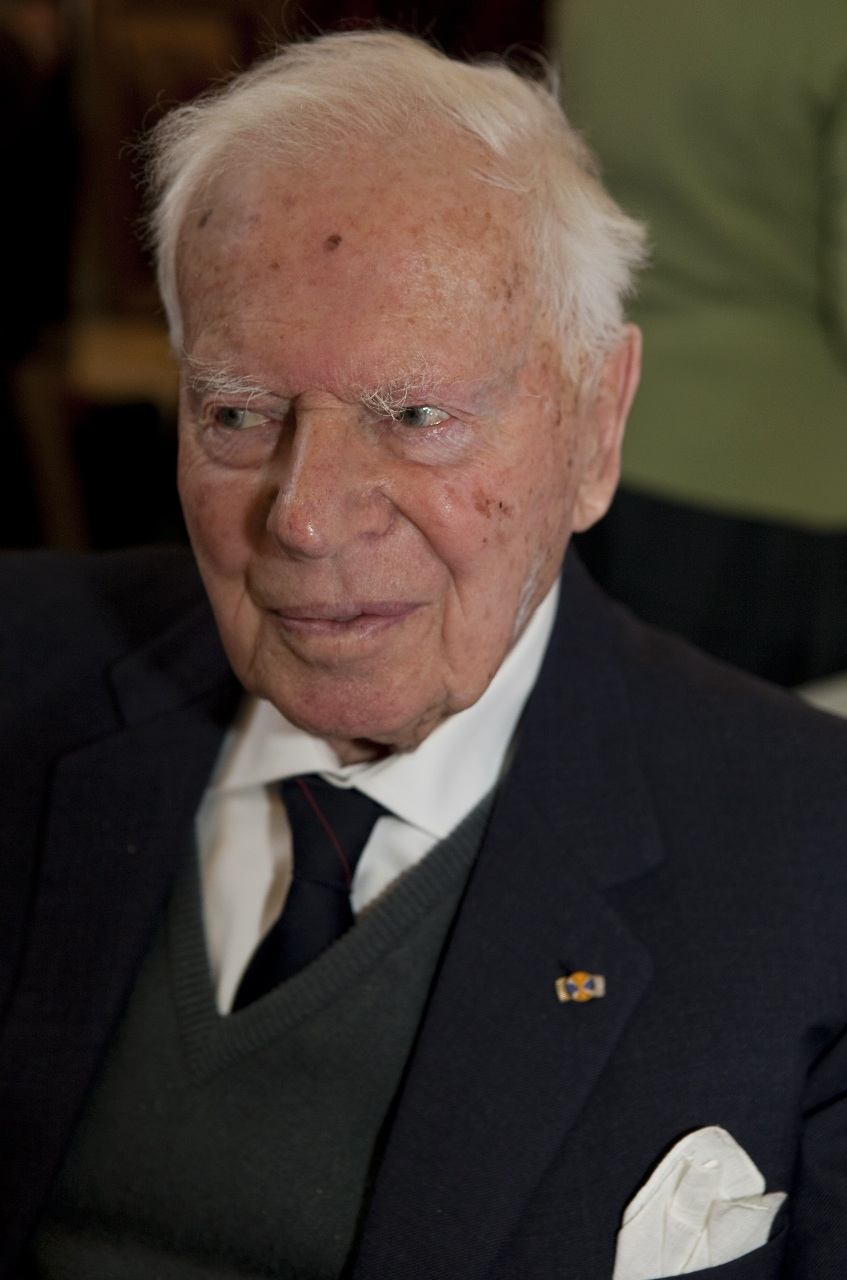
- Kohnstamm in 2009
- Born: 22 May 1914; Amsterdam, Netherlands
- Died: 20 October 2010 (aged 96); Amsterdam, Netherlands
- Education: University of Amsterdam
- Occupations: historian; diplomat

1st President of the European University Institute
- In office 1975–1981
- Succeeded by: Werner Maihofer

Max Kohnstamm OMRI (22 May 1914 – 20 October 2010) was a Dutch historian and diplomat.

== Early life ==
Max Kohnstamm was born in Amsterdam, Netherlands, the son of Philip Kohnstamm, a physicist, philosopher and pedagogue of Jewish-German origin. His father was married to one of the daughters of Jean Baptiste August Kessler, who helped create the company now known as Royal Dutch Shell; one of his uncles was Geldolph Adriaan Kessler, who helped create the Dutch steel industry. During World War II, Kohnstamm and Kessler were both held hostage by the Germans along with other prominent Dutchmen at Beekvliet in Kamp Sint-Michielsgestel; they became quite close there despite the difference in age. He was one of the founding fathers of the European Union by playing a major part in the 1950s in developing the European Coal and Steel Community (ECSC) and then of the European Economic Community.

== Education ==
Kohnstamm was educated at Amsterdam University, where he studied Modern History, before taking up a fellowship at American University, Washington, D.C. During 1938 and 1939 he travelled through the United States as part of his studies. His correspondence with his father during this period discussed his impressions of the United States and his concerns with the looming war.

== Career ==
Kohnstamm was private secretary to Queen Wilhelmina of the Netherlands from 1945 to 1948, then served with the Netherlands Foreign Office from 1948 to 1952. During this time he was head of its German Bureau and Director of European Affairs. He was Vice President of the Netherlands' Schuman Plan delegation in 1950, serving as Secretary to the High Authority of the European Coal and Steel Community from 1952 to 1956. He was Vice President of the Action Committee for the United States of Europe from 1956. He was President of the European University Institute in Florence. He was Chairman of the Trilateral Commission in Europe.

== Accomplishments ==
He was a former member of the Steering Committee of the Bilderberg Group.

He was the Founding European Chairman of the Trilateral Commission.

In 2004, Kohnstamm was awarded the 'Freedom from Fear' Four Freedoms Award by the Roosevelt Stichting.

Jacob Kohnstamm is his son.

== Death ==
He died in Amsterdam on 20 October 2010, aged 96.

== Sources ==
- "Trialogue: A Bulletin of American-European-Japanese Affairs" (PDF). The Trilateral Commission.
- de Clercq, Daan; Everts, Saskia; Langelaan, Michaja; Stoop, Ellen; van Voorst Vader-Duyckinck Sander, Jet (2010). Uit Een Bron van Weelde: Het leven van de Erven Stoop [From a Source of Wealth: The Lives of the Stoop Heirs]. Stichting Stoop-van Deventer.
