= Kamp Sint-Michielsgestel =

Internment camp during World War II in the Netherlands

Sint-Michielsgestel
- Internment camp
- Location within Netherlands
- Coordinates: 51°38′N 5°21′E
- Other names: Kamp Beekvliet; Kamp Ruwenberg
- Location: Sint-Michielsgestel, the Netherlands
- Commandant: Albert Konrad Gemmeker (1942)
- Operational: 4 May 1942 – 12 September 1944
- Inmates: Notables; Indisch
- Number of inmates: 700 (peak)
- Notable inmates: List

Kamp Sint-Michielsgestel was an ilag that was set up by the German occupiers during World War II in the Ruwenberg boarding school and the Beekvliet minor seminary in Sint-Michielsgestel.

== History ==
=== Notable hostages ===
On 4 May 1942, Kamp Sint-Michielsgestel, located in the Beekvliet minor seminary in Sint-Michielsgestel, was opened. The first inhabitants were 460 prominent Dutch individuals arrested that day, including politicians, mayors, professors, clergy, lawyers, writers, and musicians. Until the end of 1944, hundreds of notable Dutch citizens were held hostage. The Nazis believed that by holding these people as hostages, they could control the Dutch resistance and stated that they would be executed in the event of unrest in the country.

=== Indische hostages ===
In May 1942, the Indische hostages were also transferred to Kamp Sint-Michielsgestel. Most of the Indische hostages were Dutch people on leave from the Dutch East Indies and were taken hostage in July 1940 as retaliation for the imprisonment of Germans in the Dutch East Indies. The men were initially interned in Kamp Schoorl, Buchenwald concentration camp and Kamp Haaren, and finally ended up in Kamp Sint-Michielsgestel. On 7 October 1940, an additional 116 men were added to this group in Buchenwald, although they were not from the Dutch East Indies and mostly held prominent positions.

In early 1943, the Indische hostages were transferred to Ruwenberg, one and a half kilometers from Beekvliet, but still part of Kamp Sint-Michielsgestel. The hostages had relatively more freedom there.

=== Executions ===
On 15 August 1942, five notable hostages were killed as reprisal for a failed bombing in Rotterdam on a train of the German army. They were Willem Ruys, Robert Baelde, Otto Ernst Gelder, Christoffel Bennekers, and Alexander Schimmelpenninck van der Oye. A second execution of fifteen notable hostages took place in October 1942, again in retaliation for acts of resistance.

== Activities ==
=== Intellectual activities ===
The notable hostages, many of whom were intellectuals, organised seminars for each other on subjects such as history, philosophy, drawing, and economics. Because of these activities, some hostages nicknamed it the People's university.

=== Political activities ===
Dutch society before World War II was highly pillarised, which meant that Protestants, Catholics, liberals and socialists had separate social institutions and organisations and thus rarely came into contact with each other. But because the Germans had taken notables hostage from all these social groups, their notables came into contact in Kamp Sint-Michielsgestel. This created a solidarity among them that was later called the "Ghost of Gestel" (Dutch: Geest van Gestel).

==== Heeren Zeventien ====
Seventeen men led by Wim Schermerhorn formed the Heeren Zeventien (Gentlemen Seventeen), named after the leadership of the Dutch East India Company. It included Day von Balluseck, Willem Banning, Ton Barge, Louis Einthoven, Pieter Geijl, Marinus van der Goes van Naters, Dolf Joekes, Max Kohnstamm, Hendrik Kraemer, Piet Lieftinck, Nicolaas Okma, Jan de Quay, Maan Sassen, Teun Struycken and Frans Wijffels. This group discussed the future of the Netherlands after the war.

==== Legacy ====
One of the legacies of the political activities was the founding of the Nederlandse Volksbeweging and later the Labour Party (PvdA). The hostages had however underestimated the firmness of the pillars and the anticipated breakthrough failed to materialize.

== Prisoners ==
- Piet Alberts
- Hendrik Algra
- Hendrik Andriessen
- Willem Andriessen
- Frits de Nerée tot Babberich
- Robert Baelde
- Daniel Johannes von Balluseck
- Willem Banning
- Jan Jozua Barendsen
- Ton Barge
- Wiert Berghuis
- Piet Bongaarts
- Hendrik Botterweg
- Anton Constandse
- Onno Damsté
- Jan Donner
- Willem Drees
- Anton van Duinkerken
- Jan van der Dussen
- Louis Einthoven
- Huub Franssen
- Pieter Geijl
- Marinus Hendrik Gelinck
- Marinus van der Goes van Naters
- Jan Goudriaan
- Koeno Gravemeijer
- Paul Guermonprez
- Frans van Haaren
- Jan Hazenberg
- Reinier van der Heijden
- Hans Linthorst Homan
- Harm van Houten
- Dolf Joekes
- Jo Juda
- Dolf Kessler
- Max Kohnstamm
- Victor Jacob Koningsberger
- Hendrik Kraemer
- Piet Lieftinck
- Leopold Roland Middelberg
- Marcel Minnaert
- Jan van de Mortel
- Willem Augustijn Offerhaus
- Nicolaas Okma
- Pieter Oud
- Adriaan Paulen
- Jan de Quay
- Tijn Receveur
- P.H. Ritter jr.
- Carl Romme
- Bram Rutgers
- Willem Ruys
- Maan Sassen
- Wim Schermerhorn
- Alexander Schimmelpenninck van der Oye
- Jos Schmutzer
- Jan Nicolaas Spoelstra
- Henri Staal
- Herman Strategier
- Teun Struycken
- Ko Suurhoff
- Jan Terpstra
- Co den Tex
- Frans-Jozef van Thiel
- Hendrik Tilanus
- Niko Tinbergen
- Jetze Tjalma
- Rinke Tolman
- Jan Tuin
- Cypriaan Gerard Carel Quarles van Ufford
- Karel van Veen
- Timotheus Josephus Verschuur
- Simon Vestdijk
- Nico Vijlbrief
- Frans Wijffels
