= Heeren Zeventien =

Heeren zeventien may refer to:

- Leadership of the Dutch East India Company
- Group of intellectuals in Kamp Sint-Michielsgestel
