= Sim Visser =

Dutch politician (1908–1983)

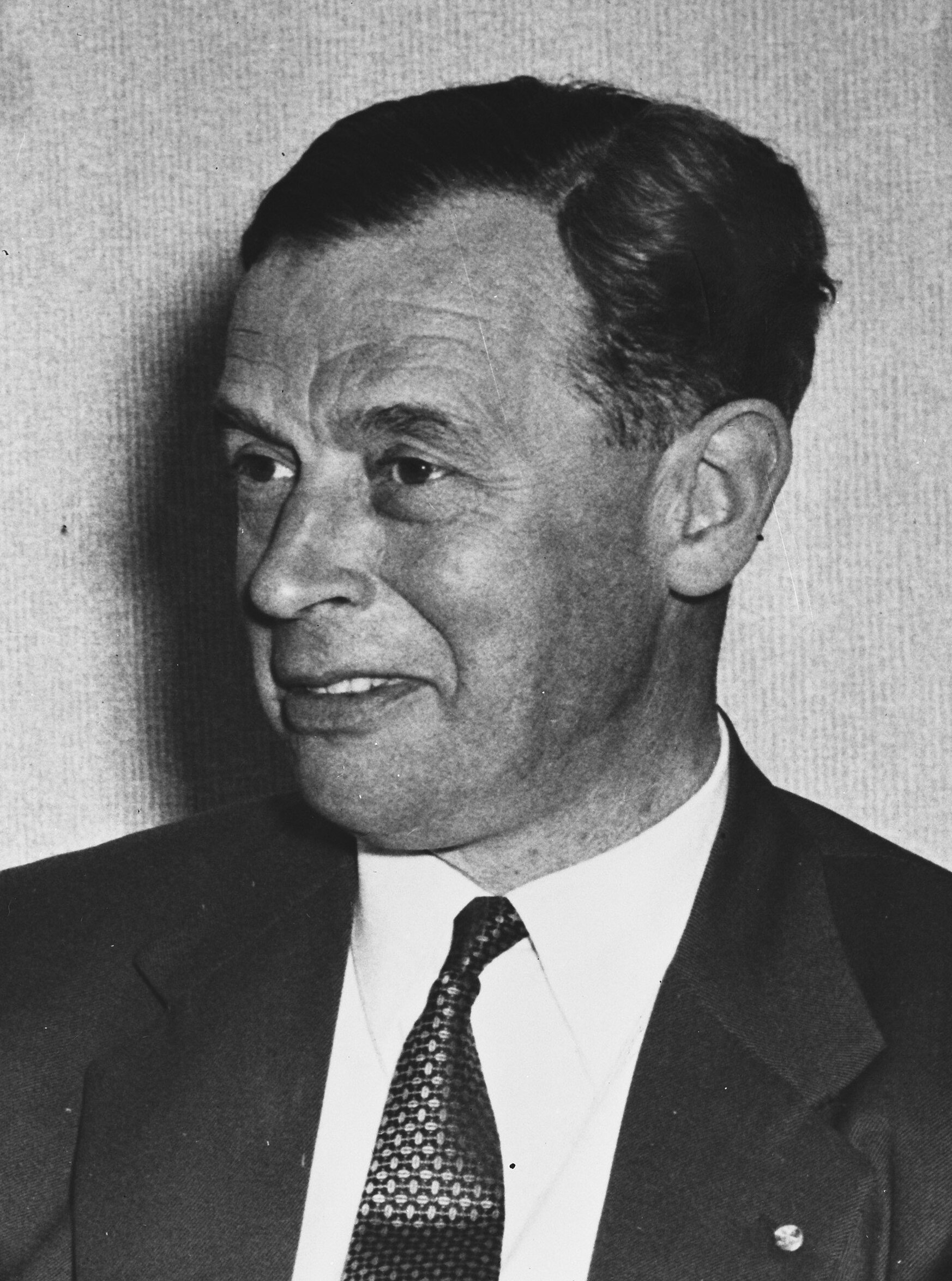
- Visser in 1959

Mayor of Den Helder
- In office 16 December 1967 – 1 January 1973
- Preceded by: Gerrit Dirk Rehorst
- Succeeded by: Aldert van Bruggen

Minister of Defence
- In office 4 September 1959 – 24 July 1963
- Prime Minister: Jan de Quay
- Preceded by: Jan de Quay (Ad interim)
- Succeeded by: Piet de Jong

Personal details
- Born: Simon Hendrik Visser; 3 January 1908 De Cocksdorp, Netherlands
- Died: 13 April 1983 (aged 75) Den Helder, Netherlands
- Party: People's Party for Freedom and Democracy (1952–1977)
- Spouse: Margaretha Catharina Kruijt-bosch (m. 1934)
- Children: 3 sons and 2 daughters
- Education: Wageningen Agricultural College (Bachelor of Agriculture, Master of Science in Engineering)
- Occupation: Politician; Agronomist; Agricultural engineer; Trade association executive; Nonprofit director

Simon Hendrik "Sim" Visser (3 January 1908 – 13 April 1983) was a Dutch politician of the People's Party for Freedom and Democracy (VVD).

Political offices
| Preceded by Jan de Quay; Ad interim | Minister of Defence; 1959–1963 | Succeeded by Piet de Jong |
| Preceded by Gerrit Dirk Rehorst | Mayor of Den Helder; 1967–1973 | Succeeded by Aldert van Bruggen |
