= Maurice Henri Léonard Pirenne =

Belgian scientist known for his work in vision physiology

Maurice Henri Léonard Pirenne (30 May 1912, Verviers–11 October 1978, Oxford) was a Belgian scientist known for his work in vision physiology.

== Early life and education ==
Pirenne was born to Maria (née Duesberg) and artist Maurice Lucien Henri Joseph Marie Pirenne on 30 May 1912 in Verviers, Belgium. His uncles were medievalist historian, Henri Pirenne and anatomist and cytologist Jules Duesberg. Pirenne's lifelong interest in drawing and painting, nurtured by his artist father, underscored his fascination with the convergence of visual physiology and artistic expression. While still at school he read Brücke (who experimented in anatomy, optics, and physiology) and Helmholtz on the optics of painting.

== Scientist ==
After earning his Doctor of Science degree from Liege in 1937 and supported by a grant from the Belgian government, he engaged in a year of research in molecular physics under Peter Debye's mentorship, attending seminars led by Victor Henri in which he established connections with significant fellow students. A pivotal phase of his career was the next three years, 1938–40, spent at Columbia University in New York as a Fellow of the Belgian American Educational Foundation where he collaborated with Selig Hecht to explore the biophysics of vision. With Hecht, Pirenne investigated iris contraction in the nocturnal long-eared owl in reaction to infrared radiation. This experience significantly influenced his future devotion to the biophysics of vision.

== Visual perception ==
After experiments they reported to the American Association for the Advancement of Science that received attention of the media, in 1942, a joint paper authored by Hecht, Shlaer, and Pirenne marked a turning point in the understanding of visual perception near the absolute threshold level by measuring the minimum number of photons the human eye can detect 60% of the time. This paper highlighted that the perceived variability, previously attributed to biological causes, predominantly stemmed from physical fluctuations in the small quantity of light quanta absorbed by the visual photo-pigment. Pirenne's subsequent research revolved around the visual threshold and its correlation with visual acuity.

== England ==
During WW2 from March 1941, he had to break with science and joined the Belgian Forces marshalled in Canada, as a reserve officer, and in June of that year he was in Great Britain as secretary-treasurer of the Central Welfare Committee of the Belgian Land Forces. On his return to England, Pirenne's intricate neurophysiological studies of 'on' and 'off' neuronal units and their interactions found practical application in screening military personnel for night blindness which he carried out there until 1945.

Pirenne employed his investigations of the senses in a physiological approach to the philosophical mind-body problem, and worked in academic positions in Cambridge and was appointed ICI research fellow at London University in 1945 during which he published The diffraction of X-rays and electrons by free molecules in 1946, then Aberdeen, where he lectured in physiology 1948–1955 while continuing to write on his investigation of visual thresholds, before joining the University Laboratory of Physiology at Oxford in 1955.

His appointment as a fellow with Wolfson College recognised his teaching methods, remembered for their hands-on demonstrations and pragmatic approach, based on his meticulous preparation.

Engaged briefly to Margaret Billinghurst in 1946, Pirenne married, on 16 May 1947, Katherine ('Kathy') Alice Mary Clutton, born in Devonport and they remained partners until the end of his life. In 1948 he was naturalised as a British citizen.

== Publications ==
Pirenne published on the relation of optics to art, notably in the 1952 essay "The scientific basis of Leonardo da Vinci's theory of perspective." His 1970 work, Optics, Painting and Photography, investigated optical and perspective effects in trompe-l'oeil art and photography, analysed through imagery from a pinhole camera. In it he notably refutes Erwin Panofsky's claim that due to the curvature of the retina, the geometrical construction of perspective, (which provides an image on a plane) does not correspond to what is actually perceived and should also use curves—to which Pirenne responds that;

...the fact that the retina, and perforce the retinal image, are curved [...] has led some authors to the idea that a truly 'physiological' perspective should consist of some kind of pseudo-development upon the picture plane of an image curved in shape like the retinal image, which allegedly would lead to systems of 'curvilinear perspective'. But, first, the retinal image is not what we see: what we see is the external world. Secondly, the geometrical construction of such a pseudo-development remains obscure--unless it leads back to central, 'rectilinear', perspective. It would be pointless to reiterate the argument that central perspective, in which straight lines are never projected as curves on a plane, is the only method which is capable of producing a retinal image having the same shape as the retinal image of the actual obiects depicted.

Pirenne's final publication in 1975, titled Vision and Art, continued his explorations between visual perception and its artistic interpretation.

== Legacy ==
Amongst his eighty publications, Pirenne's 1948 Vision and the Eye, remained an authoritative and accessible introduction to the subject. His stature as an international authority in visual physiology was affirmed through recognition such as a Doctor of Science degree from Cambridge in 1972 and his appointment as a Foreign Member of the Royal Belgian Academy of Sciences. He died in Oxford on 11 October 1978.
