= Herman Strategier =

Dutch musician

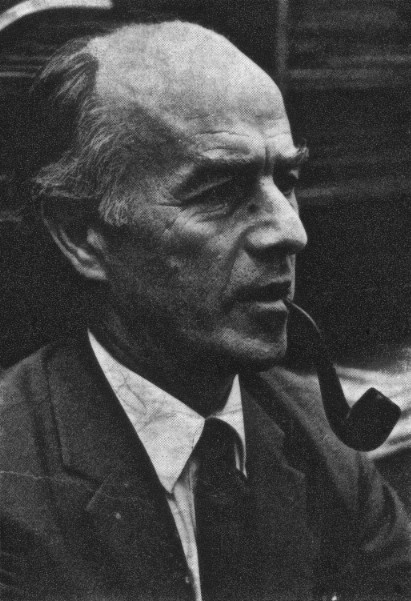
Nederlands: Herman Strategier

Johan Herman Strategier (August 10, 1912, in Arnhem – October 26, 1988, in Doorwerth) was a composer, organist, and conductor from The Netherlands. Strategier studied at the Roman Catholic School of Church Music in Utrecht. He served as conductor of Leiden's Dutch Madrigal Choir and also composed a number of larger concert works, among them are Don Ramiro (1943) for chorus and orchestra, Rembrandt Cantata (1956), and Shadow out of Time (1973) for ad libitum chorus, flute, percussion, organ, harp, and tape.

== Selected works ==
- Klok-muziek (Bell Music, 1972), for carillon
- Suite Felix (1978), for carillon
