= Piet Lieftinck =

Dutch politician (1902–1989)

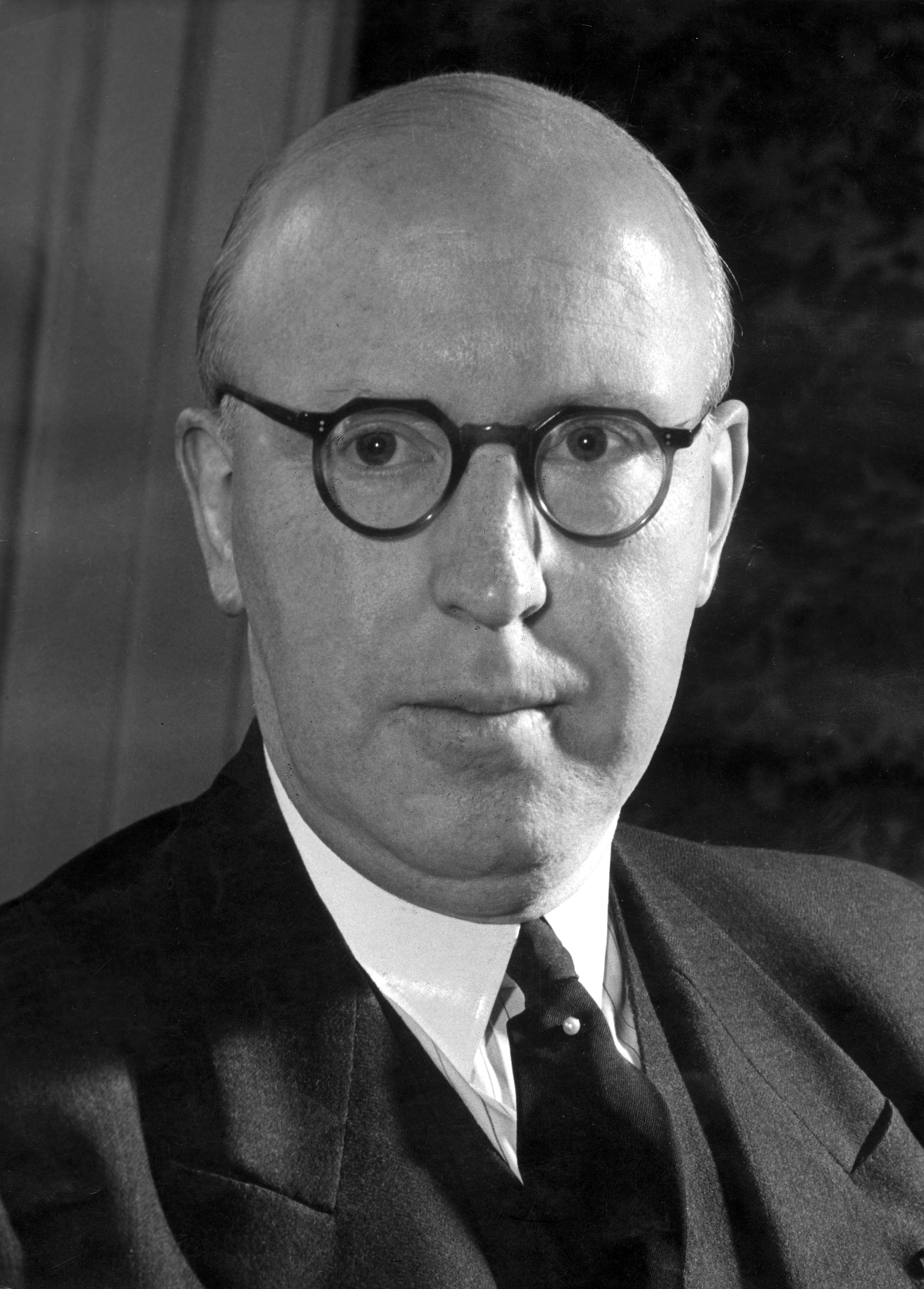
- Piet Lieftinck in 1948

Member of the Senate
- In office 27 July 1948 – 11 August 1948
- Parliamentary group: Labour Party

Member of the House of Representatives
- In office 4 June 1946 – 8 July 1946
- Parliamentary group: Labour Party

Minister of Finance
- In office 25 June 1945 – 1 July 1952
- Prime Minister: See list: Willem Schermerhorn (1945–1946) Louis Beel (1946–1948) Willem Drees (1948–1952)
- Preceded by: Gerardus Huysmans
- Succeeded by: Willem Drees (Ad interim)

Personal details
- Born: Pieter Lieftinck; 30 September 1902 Muiden, Netherlands
- Died: 9 July 1989 (aged 86) The Hague, Netherlands
- Party: Labour Party (1946–1971)
- Other political affiliations: Independent Social Democrat (from 1979); Democratic Socialists '70 (1971–1979); People's Movement (1945–1946); Christian Historical Union (until 1945)
- Spouses: Henriëtte Clasine Aldershoff (m. 1932; div. 1954) Elsa van der Voort (m. 1954)
- Children: 4
- Education: Utrecht University (Bachelor of Economics, Bachelor of Laws, Master of Economics, Master of Laws, Doctor of Philosophy); Columbia University (Master of Financial Economics)
- Occupation: Politician · Civil servant · Jurist · Economist · Financial analyst · Financial adviser · Researcher · Businessman · Banker · Corporate director · Nonprofit director · Author · Professor

Military service
- Allegiance: Netherlands
- Branch/service: Royal Netherlands Army
- Years of service: 1927–1928 (Conscription); 1928–1940 (Reserve); 1940 (Active duty)
- Rank: Lieutenant
- Unit: Army Artillery
- Battles/wars: World War II; Battle of the Netherlands; Battle of France

Pieter "Piet" Lieftinck (30 September 1902 – 9 July 1989) was a Dutch politician of the Christian Historical Union (CHU) party and later the Labour Party (PvdA) and economist.

Lieftinck applied at the Utrecht University in June 1919 majoring in Law and Economics and obtaining Bachelor of Economics and Bachelor of Laws degrees in July 1922 and worked as a student researcher before graduating with a Master of Economics and Master of Laws degree's in October 1927. Lieftinck served in the Royal Netherlands Army as a lieutenant from November 1927 until November 1928. Lieftinck applied at the Columbia University in New York City in April 1929 for a postgraduate education and obtained a Master of Financial Economics degree in December 1930 and later returned to the Utrecht University where worked as a researcher and got a doctorate as a Doctor of Philosophy in Public economics on 10 December 1931. Lieftinck worked as civil servant for the Ministry of Labour, Commerce and Industry from August 1931 until May 1932 and for the Ministry of Economic Affairs and Labour from May 1932 until June 1933 and the Ministry of Economic Affairs from June 1933 until October 1934 as Director-General of the department for General Economic Policy from June 1933 until October 1934. Lieftinck worked as a professor of Public economics at the Erasmus University Rotterdam from 11 October 1934 until 30 March 1940. Lieftinck also served in the military reserve force of the Royal Netherlands Army and was mobilized in March 1940. On 10 May 1940 Nazi Germany invaded the Netherlands and the government fled to London to escape the German occupation. Lieftinck fought in the Battle of the Netherlands and the Battle of France and was captured following the capitulation and detained in Kamp Sint-Michielsgestel from October 1940 until he was transferred to Haren in November 1940 and was transferred to Buchenwald concentration camp in April 1941 and was released in January 1943.

Following the end of World War II Queen Wilhelmina ordered the formation of a cabinet of national unity to reorganize the state and make preparations for new elections with Lieftinck appointed as Minister of Finance in the Cabinet Schermerhorn–Drees, taking office on 25 June 1945. On 9 February 1946 the Social Democratic Workers' Party (SDAP), the Free-thinking Democratic League (VDB) party and the Christian Democratic Union (CDU) party choose to merge to form the Labour Party (PvdA), Lieftinck left the Christian Historical Union and subsequently joined the Labour Party. After the election of 1946 Lieftinck was elected as a Member of the House of Representatives, taking office on 4 June 1946. Following the cabinet formation of 1946 Lieftinck continued as Minister of Finance in the Cabinet Beel I, taking office on 3 July 1946. In April 1948 Lieftinck announced that he wouldn't stand for the election of 1948 but wanted run for the Senate. After the Senate election of 1948 Lieftinck was elected as a Member of the Senate, serving briefly from 27 July 1948 until 11 August 1948. After the election of 1948 Lieftinck continued as Minister of Finance in the Cabinet Drees–Van Schaik, taking office on 7 August 1948. The Cabinet Drees-Van Schaik fell on 24 January 1951 and continued to serve in a demissionary capacity until the cabinet formation of 1951 when it was replaced by Cabinet Drees I with Lieftinck remaining as Minister of Finance, taking office on 15 March 1951.

In June 1952 Lieftinck was appointed as the Special Representative of the World Bank in Ankara, he resigned as Minister of Finance the same day he took office as the Special Representative of the World Bank on 1 July 1952. In September 1955 Lieftinck was nominated as an Executive Director of the World Bank Group and Executive Director for Benelux, Israel and Eastern Europe of the International Monetary Fund in Washington, D.C., taking office on 1 October 1955. Serving as Executive Director of the World Bank Group, from 1 October 1955 until 1 May 1971 and as Executive Director of the International Monetary Fund from 1 October 1955 until 1 December 1976. Lieftinck also became active in the private sector and public sector and served as a financial adviser for Suriname from 1 August 1958 until 10 November 1975 and the KLM from 25 April 1963 until September 1977.

Lieftinck was known for his abilities as a manager and policy wonk. Lieftinck continued to comment on political affairs as a statesman until his death.

== Biography ==
=== Early life ===
Lieftinck became professor at the Erasmus University Rotterdam at a relatively young age. Before the second world war, he supported the left wing of the Protestant Christian Democrats (CHU). In 1945, he joined NVB, which failed in the elections of 1946. In 1946, he moved to the socialist party (PvdA) and in 1971 he joined the moderate leftist DS'70 party.

From May 1942, he was a prominent hostage in Kamp Sint-Michielsgestel. He worked with other politicians on ideas of a new political constellation after the second world war in the breakthrough committee.

=== Politics ===
In June 1945, Lieftinck became the first post war minister of Finance of the Netherlands. He inherited a deeply troubled economy. A third of the national assets were destroyed. The infrastructure was greatly damaged in war action. Rotterdam was destroyed, practically all the large bridges were damaged and some large polders had been flooded. On top of that, the Allies demanded an expeditionary Royal Netherlands Army to fight in the Pacific.

The disastrous situation in the economy was further threatened by a sick financial economy. The government in exile had taken the gold reserves to London and had, to a significant degree, spent them. In the Netherlands, exports of money, goods and services to Nazi Germany were credited to a Reichsmark account in Berlin that was, of course, never paid. The government budget was in heavy deficit, which was financed by printing money. The Dutch guilder was linked to the Reichsmark at the fixed rate of 1.327. In this way, the value of the Dutch guilder was completely linked to that of the Reichsmark and in 1945 the Reichsmark wasn't worth anything. These circumstances fulfilled all the conditions for an outbreak of hyperinflation: the money supply had quadrupled from 2.5 billion guilder to 10.9 billion guilder while the supply of goods was only a fraction of what it had been.

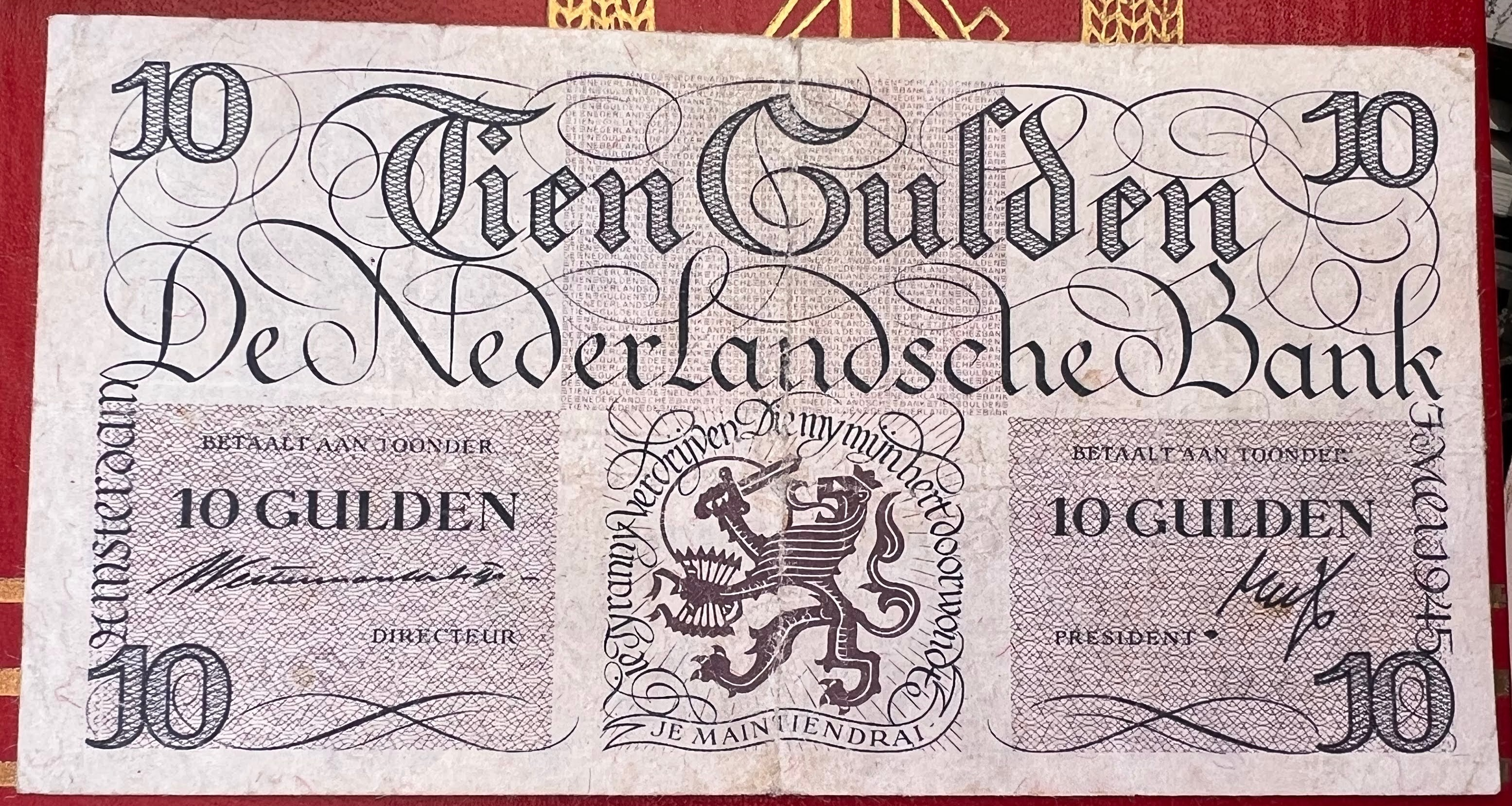
Lieftinck's tenner

The new minister of Finance started by withdrawing the 100 guilder note in July 1945. Those holding notes were given a blocked bank credit. This note had been the subject of distrust anyway and many were held by war profiteers. On 25 September 1945 it was announced that as of the next day all banknotes were withdrawn and all bank credits frozen. All paper cash handed in gave rise to a credit on a blocked bank account. For one week, until 2 October 1945 there was no valid paper money in the country with a single exception. Everyone with a distribution card could change ten guilder in withdrawn notes for new money. This action was known as Lieftinck's tenner. Significantly, although the amount was small, it was enough for a week.

In the week of 26 September 1945, banks were supplied with new banknotes, so that people could receive their wages. In the following months, de-blocking started. On 19 September 1946 a special tax was levied on any positive difference in assets between May 1940 and December 1945. Tax rates were raised from 50% to 70% and to 90% for unexplained profits, largely in order to hit war profiteers. An additional tax on liquid assets was introduced on 11 July 1946. Rates went from 4% to 20% and the decision was heavily criticised.

The measures enacted were successful in addressing the currency issues affecting the Dutch economy, with the money supply being halved and inflation kept at a reasonable level. This set the stage for meeting American demands to qualify for Marshall aid. Profiteers had helped to finance reparations of war damage. A major wealth redistribution of wealth had occurred and the economy had been put on a new and sound footing; both points had been high on the wish list of the Beekvliet reformers.

Lieftinck introduced a new coinage law in 1948, abrogating gold standard coins. In the same year, he moved a new banking law through parliament. He retired as minister in 1952, and proceeded to serve as an Executive Director of the International Monetary Fund from 1955 until his retirement in 1976. After retirement he remained active as an advisor to successive Dutch and Suriname governments on matters of economic and financial reform.

== Political party function ==
- Member of the executive board of the Christian Historical Union, from 1938 to 1939

== Decorations ==
Honours
Ribbon bar	Honour	Country	Date	Comment
	Commander of the Order of the Netherlands Lion	Netherlands	30 April 1965	
	Knight Grand Cross of the Order of Orange-Nassau	Netherlands	24 November 1976	Elevated from Grand Officer (30 September 1952)

Political offices
Preceded by Gerardus Huysmans	Minister of Finance; 1945–1952	Succeeded by Willem Drees; Ad interim
Civic offices
Unknown	Director-General of the Department for General Economic Policy of the Ministry of Economic Affairs; 1933–1934	Unknown
Diplomatic posts
Unknown	Executive Director of the World Bank Group; 1955–1971	Unknown
Unknown	Executive Director for Benelux, Israel and Eastern Europe of the International Monetary Fund; 1955–1976	Succeeded by Onno Ruding
Records
Preceded by Willem Drees	Oldest living former cabinet member 14 May 1988 – 9 June 1989	Succeeded by Henk Hofstra
