= Maurice Pirenne =

Belgian painter (1878–1968)

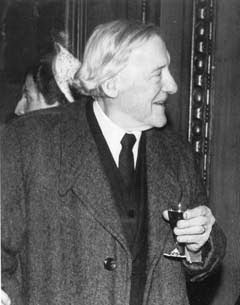
Maurice Pirenne

Maurice Pirenne (1878, Verviers–November 25, 1968, Verviers) was a Belgian painter.

== Early life and training ==
Maurice Lucien Henri Joseph Marie Pirenne was the son of Virginie, née Duesberg (1839-1924) and Lucien-Henri Pirenne, a textile industrialist from Verviers. His brother was the historian Henri Pirenne. In his youth he became friends with Georges Le Brun, and both were encouraged by their drawing teacher Constant Simon at the Royal Athenaeum of Verviers. Abandoning his study in Graeco-Roman humanities, he devoted himself to painting. Between 1893 and 1899, he trained in Ghent, where he made the acquaintance of Albert Baertsoen and his Cercle des Beaux-Arts d'Ostende, then in Bruges, Paris, and finally Brussels.

== Career ==
Around 1900 he returned to his native town, where he stayed for the rest of his life. Still with Georges Le Brun and Albert Baertsoen, he frequented Octave Maus' La Libre Esthétique for a while and with whom he rejected the gratuitous virtuosity and violent of states of mind of expressionism (“Take your personality and lock it in a safe").

In 1905, he married Maria Duesberg who bore a son, Maurice Henri Léonard, in 1912, an impetus for the painter's production of a series of intimate pastels representing domestic family scenes. The son was a scientist, and inspired and encouraged by his father, developed a lifelong interest in drawing and painting which underscored his fascination with the convergence of visual physiology and artistic expression.

In 1910, he became the curator of the Verviers museum, replacing the museum's founder Jean Simon Renier, becoming a defender of local heritage. For more than 25 years, he painted some 600 small atmospherically luminous pastels representing urban Verviers.

He joined societies and associations linked to archeology and the fine arts: the Royal Commission of Monuments and Sites, the Verviétoise Society of Archeology and History, and the Society of Fine Arts, the sole venue in which he continued to exhibit with his Verviers friends Georges Le Brun, Philippe Derchain, Pierre Delcour, Joseph A. Gérard, Alphonse Lejeune, Laurent Léon Herve and Oga Herla. A critic concerned with promoting Walloon art was quick to bring them together as the Peintres intimistes verviétois and in 1936, this group devoted a major retrospective exhibition to him.

== Later life ==
Around 1945, Maurice Pirenne retired to his studio and executed many studies of flowers and still lifes of everyday objects. He met and established a firm friendship with André Blavier, the librarian of the Verviers library and author of texts on René Magritte, who provided the text for books on Pirenne's paintings, his drawings, and his particular brand of modernism, making him known to a wider audience. He also organised multiple exhibitions of his works.

Pirenne became almost blind but painted (sometimes with his finger) until the last day of his life, which occurred in 1968 at the age of 96. He had the support of Blavier and Louis Klinkenberg, who were to be his executors.

He is buried in the cemetery of Verviers.

== Style ==
Pirenne was a self-taught and fiercely anti-academic painter whose models were Vermeer and Chardin who "sought only to make a perfect work". At the beginning of his career he painted large oils of the Fagne and the surroundings of his native town, but progressed to small formats, mainly in pastel, the subjects being urban landscapes and scenes of family life. As he grew older he restricted his work to his living space. Blavier remarks his "sober, simple, melancholy and poetic work," noting that; "he painted the city itself, then his garden, its flowers and the surroundings of the house, finally he returned to his home where he painted his Mirror Cabinet, the basin in the studio, his Tobacco Pot, the portrait of his friends, that of his wife, and his own, and all that he can see from his window, from his balcony overlooking the city. He painted the sky that the 'one sees everywhere". He quotes Pirenne's self-summation; "I am neither of the avant-garde, nor of the rear-guard, I am not of the herd."

== Writings by Maurice Pirenne ==
- Les Constructions verviétoises du VX au XX siècles, bulletin de la Société verviétoise d'Archéologie et d'Histoire, volume 26
- Laurent Olivier, peintre verviétois, 1808-1857, ibidem, volume 30
- Georges Le Brun, 1873-1914, sa vie de peintre, Société des Beaux-Arts de Verviers, 1920

== Texts on Maurice Pirenne ==
- Pirenne, M. H.; Blavier, André (1954). 99 reproductions d'œuvres du peintre Maurice Pirenne. Bruxelles: J. Malvaux. OCLC 504102447.
- André Blavier, Dessins de Maurice Pirenne, 1958
- Vandeloise, Guy (1969). Maurice Pirenne (in French). Verviers: Temps mêlés. OCLC 9844701.
- Une chambre à soi, Centre d'art Nicolas de Stael, textes de André Blavier et Jean-Marie Klinkenberg, 1994
- Catalogue raisonné des œuvres (en préparation): Jacques Spitz, musées de Verviers
