= Pieter Geyl =

Dutch historian (1887–1966)

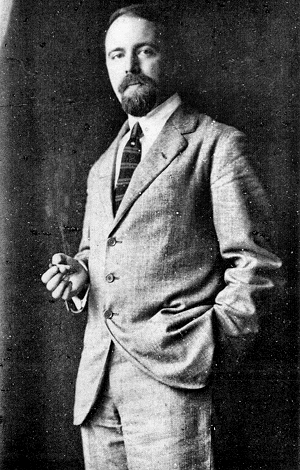
- Pieter Geijl
- Born: 15 December 1887; Dordrecht, Netherlands
- Died: 31 December 1966 (aged 79); Utrecht, Netherlands
- Education: University of Leiden
- Spouses: Maria Cornelia van Slooten (1911–1933); Garberlina Kremer (m. 1934)

Pieter Catharinus Arie Geyl (15 December 1887, Dordrecht – 31 December 1966, Utrecht) was a Dutch historian, well known for his studies in early modern Dutch history and in historiography.

== Background ==
Geyl was born in Dordrecht and graduated from the University of Leiden in 1913. His thesis was on Christofforo Suriano, the Venetian Ambassador in the Netherlands from 1616 to 1623. He was married twice, first to Maria Cornelia van Slooten in 1911 (who died in 1933) and secondly to Garberlina Kremer in 1934.

== Early career ==
Geyl worked as a teacher at Stedelijk Gymnasium Schiedam (grammar school) in Schiedam (1912–1913) before going on to serve as the London correspondent for Nieuwe Rotterdamsche Courant newspaper. During this time, Geyl befriended many influential people in Britain. In 1919 Geyl took up a professorship in Dutch history at the University of London, where he taught until 1935. In 1935, Geyl returned home to become a professor at the University of Utrecht.

In 1928 Geyl became correspondent of the Royal Netherlands Academy of Arts and Sciences; he resigned in 1936. In 1946 he joined the Academy again, this time as full member.

== Wartime experiences ==
In 1940, Geyl wrote an article on how historians view Napoleon. It was due to be published in June 1940, but after the German occupation in May 1940, the publishers declined to publish Geyl's article out of the fear that comparisons could be made between Napoleon and Adolf Hitler. In September 1940, Geyl used his article for the basis of series of lectures at the Rotterdam School of Economics. In October 1940 the SD (Security Service) of the SS took Geyl hostage in retaliation for what the Germans alleged to be maltreatment of Germans interned in the Dutch East Indies. Geyl spent thirteen months at the Buchenwald concentration camp. Even after his release from Buchenwald, Geyl continued to be held by the Germans at Kamp Sint-Michielsgestel until he was finally released for medical reasons in February 1944.

In 1945 Geyl became the chair of history at the University of Utrecht. In his opening address, he called for his students to disprove political and cultural myths that could lead to movements like National Socialism. Geyl was a critic of the Sonderweg interpretation of German history that argued that Nazi Germany was the inevitable result of the way German history developed. In particular, Geyl defended the German historian Leopold von Ranke against the charge of being a proto-Nazi.

== Geyl's historical outlook ==
Geyl was best known as a critic of the British historian Arnold J. Toynbee, who seemed to maintain that he had discovered "laws" of history that proved how civilisations rise and fall. Geyl often debated Toynbee both on the radio and in print. He accused Toynbee of selective use of evidence to support pre-conceived notions and of ignoring evidence that did not support his thesis. In addition, Geyl considered Toynbee's theory to be simplistic, ignoring the full complexity of the past; he regarded Toynbee's theory of "challenge and response" to explain historical change as too loose and a catch-all definition. Finally, Geyl was opposed to Toynbee's apparent claim that Western civilisation was in terminal decline.

Geyl was noted for challenging the then-popular theory that the historical separation of the Dutch and the Flemings was a result of "natural" causes. Geyl claimed that there was a "Greater Netherlands" history and that the Dutch and Flemings separated only during the Eighty Years' War (better known as the Dutch Revolt in the English-speaking world) against Spain in the 16th century. Geyl argued that the revolt failed in the south not because of political, cultural or religious differences, but only because the geography in the north with its lakes, bogs and rivers favoured the rebels and the geography in the south with its flat plains favoured the Spanish Army. Had it not been for the accident of geography, Flanders would have been part of the Dutch Republic. Geyl expressed his ideas in a series of articles and in his main work, De Geschiedenis van de Nederlandse Stam (1930–1959, unfinished). In accordance with his historical ideas, Geyl actively supported the Flemish movement, though not favouring Dutch-Flemish irredentism.

Geyl's work has been criticised for not taking into account the unifying force of administrative and economic developments after the separation and for sometimes drawing artificial boundaries based on language alone; on the other hand, it has been praised for its refreshing approach to the Dutch Revolt, which was in marked opposition to the then-current nationally oriented, almost finalistic view on Dutch and Belgian history as represented by P.J. Blok and Henri Pirenne.

Geyl was also noted for arguing that the House of Orange and the Dutch people were often in conflict, especially during the 18th century. Geyl accused William IV of Orange of using the uprising of the Doelisten (a group of Amsterdam burgers) against the ruling elite to seize power for himself in 1748. Another revisionist claim made by Geyl was that the marriage of William of Orange (later stadtholder Willem II) to Mary Stuart was the main cause of the first Anglo-Dutch War in the 17th century.

Napoleon For and Against was an account of how French historians of different ages and views have regarded the French emperor. From Napoleon's time to the present, French historians have presented Napoleon as either a Corsican adventurer who brought death and destruction to France or as a patriotic Frenchman who brought glory and prosperity. Geyl used his book to advance his view that all historians are influenced by the present when writing history and thus all historical writing is transitory. In Geyl's view, there never can be a definitive account for all ages because every age has a different view of the past. For Geyl the best that historians could do was to critically examine their beliefs and urge their readers to do likewise. Geyl felt that history was a progress of "argument without end", but did not feel that this meant that an "anything goes" interpretation of history was acceptable.

== Death ==
Geyl died on 31 December 1966 in Utrecht, Netherlands.

== Published works ==
- Christofforo Suriano: resident van de Serenissime Republiek van Venetië in Den Haag, 1616–1623, 1913.
- Willem IV en Engeland tot 1748, 1924.
- De Groot-Nederlandsche gedachte, 1925.
- De geschiedenis van de Nederlandsche Stam, 3 volumes, 1930–1959: translated into English as The Revolt of the Netherlands, 1555–1609 and The Netherlands in the Seventeenth Century.
- Revolutiedagen te Amsterdam, Augustus–September 1748, 1936.
- Patriotten en NSBers, 1946.
- History of the Low Countries: Episodes and Problems, Macmillan, 1964. The Trevelyan Lectures 1963, with 4 additional essays.
- The Revolt of the Netherlands, 1555–1609, New York: Barnes & Noble, 1966.
- The Netherlands in the Seventeenth Century, Pt. I: 1609-1648; Pt.II: 1648-1715, 2 volumes, New York: Barnes & Noble, 1961 & 1964.
- Oranje en Stuart, 1641–72, 1939: translated by A. Pomerans into English as Orange and Stuart, 1641–72, New York: Scribner, 1970.
- Napoleon: voor en tegen in de Franse geschiedschrijving, 1946: translated by O. Renier into English as Napoleon, For and Against, New Haven, CT; Yale University Press, 1948; revised edition 1964.
- De Patriottenbeweging, 1780–1787, 1947.
- Can We Know the Pattern of the Past? Discussion between P. Geyl and A. Toynbee concerning Toynbee's Book 'A Study of History', Bossum: F.G. Kroonder, co-written with Arnold Toynbee, 1948.
- The Pattern of the Past: Can we Determine it? cowritten with Arnold Toynbee and P. Sorokin, New York: Greenwood, 1949.
- Use and Abuse of History, New Haven, CT: Yale University Press, 1955.
- Debates with Historians, Cleveland, Ohio: Meridian, 1958.
- Studies en strijdschriften, 1958.
- Encounters in History, Cleveland, Ohio: Meridian, 1961.

== See also ==
- Napoleon legacy and memory
