= Marinus van der Goes van Naters =

Dutch politician and lawyer (1900–2005)

Jonkheer Marinus van der Goes van Naters
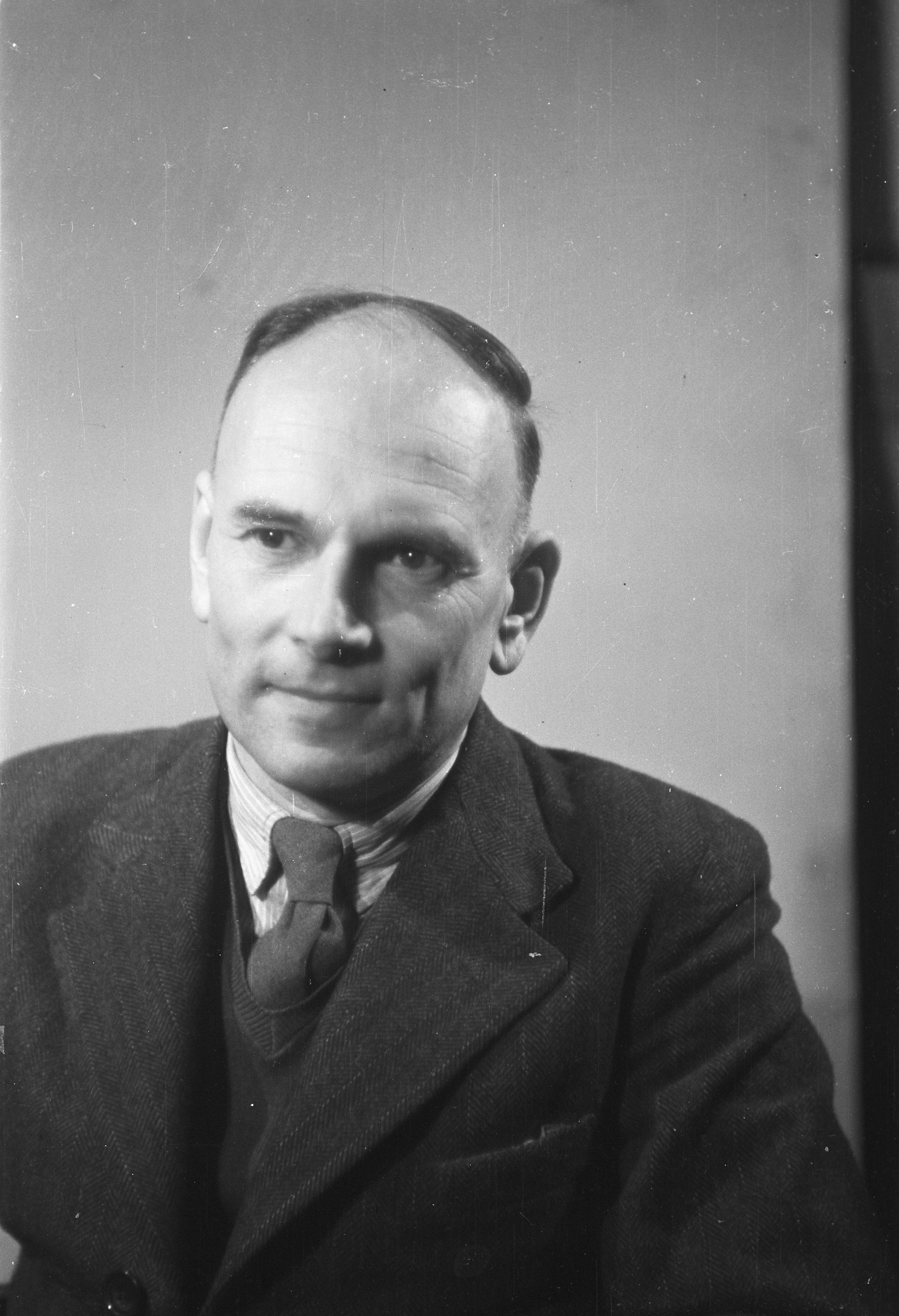
- Marinus van der Goes van Naters in 1946

Member of the European Parliament
- In office 1 January 1958 – 7 May 1967
- Parliamentary group: Socialist Group
- Constituency: Netherlands

Member of the European Coal and Steel Community Parliament
- In office 10 September 1952 – 1 January 1958
- Parliamentary group: Socialist Group
- Constituency: Netherlands

Parliamentary leader in the House of Representatives
- In office 4 June 1946 – 16 January 1951
- Preceded by: Office established
- Succeeded by: Jaap Burger
- Parliamentary group: Labour Party
- In office 25 September 1945 – 4 June 1946
- Preceded by: Willem Drees
- Succeeded by: Office discontinued
- Parliamentary group: Social Democratic Workers' Party

Member of the House of Representatives
- In office 4 June 1946 – 22 February 1967
- In office 8 June 1937 – 4 June 1946

Personal details
- Born: Marinus van der Goes van Naters; 21 December 1900 Nijmegen, Netherlands
- Died: 12 February 2005 (aged 104) Wassenaar, Netherlands
- Party: Labour Party (from 1946)
- Other political affiliations: Social Democratic Workers' Party (until 1946)
- Spouse: Anneke van der Plaats (m. 1924; died 1985)
- Children: 5
- Education: Leiden University (LLB, LLM, PhD)
- Occupation: Politician; Jurist; lawyer; activist; author

Jonkheer Marinus van der Goes van Naters (21 December 1900 – 12 February 2005) was a Dutch politician of the defunct Social Democratic Workers' Party (SDAP) and later the Labour Party (PvdA) and lawyer.

== Background and early career ==
He was born in Nijmegen. He was a member of the House of Representatives from 1937 to 1967 and in-parliament chairman of the social democratic parties SDAP and its successor the Labour Party from 1945 to 1951.

=== Imprisonment at Buchenwald and elsewhere ===
From 1940 to 1944 during World War II he was held hostage by the German occupiers in various camps, including Kamp Sint-Michielsgestel and Buchenwald concentration camp.

== German border issues after World War II ==
In the mid-1950s he was involved in the eponymous plan adopted by the Council of Europe for the settlement of the Saar question. In the post-war years he successfully argued that the Duivelsberg (German: Wylerberg or Teufelsberg), annexed from Germany after World War II, be retained permanently by the Netherlands.

== Death ==
He died in 2005 at the age of 104 in Wassenaar, Netherlands.

== Decorations ==
Honours
Ribbon bar	Honour	Country	Date	Comment
	Knight of the Order of the Netherlands Lion	Netherlands	30 April 1951	
	Commander of the Order of Orange-Nassau	Netherlands	22 February 1967	

Party political offices
Preceded by Willem Drees	Parliamentary leader of the Social Democratic Workers' Party in the House of Representatives; 1945–1946	Party merged into the Labour Party
New political party	Parliamentary leader of the Labour Party in the House of Representatives; 1946–1951	Succeeded by Jaap Burger
Records
Preceded by Willem Drees	Oldest living former member of the States General; 14 May 1988 – 12 February 2005	Succeeded by Johan van Hulst
