= Jo Meynen =

Dutch politician (1901–1980)

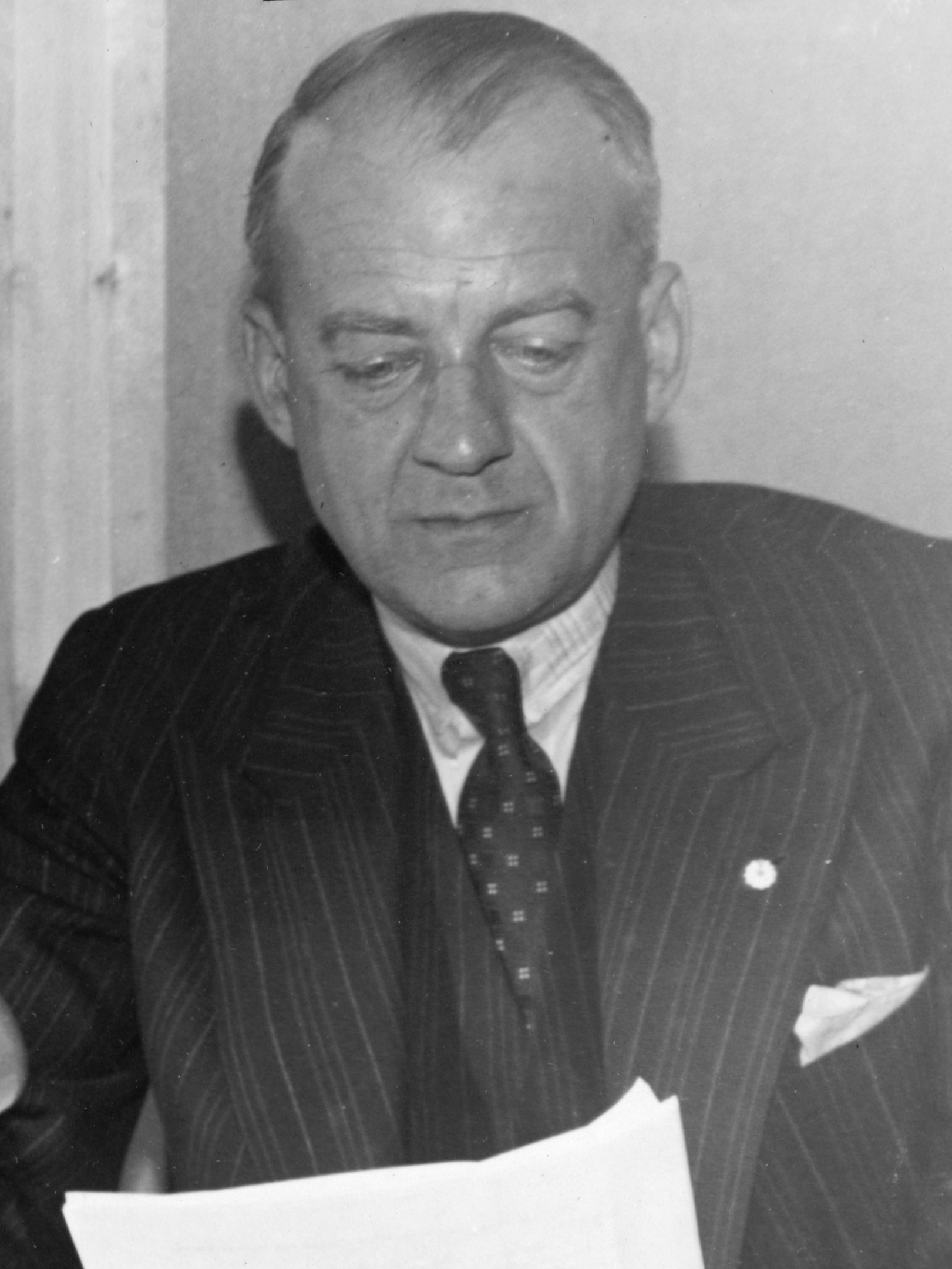
Jo Meynen (1945)

Johannes Meynen (13 April 1901, Winsum, Friesland – 13 February 1980, Velp) was a Dutch politician. He was a member of the Steering Committee of the Bilderberg Group.
