= Anton van Duinkerken =

Dutch poet, essayist, and academic

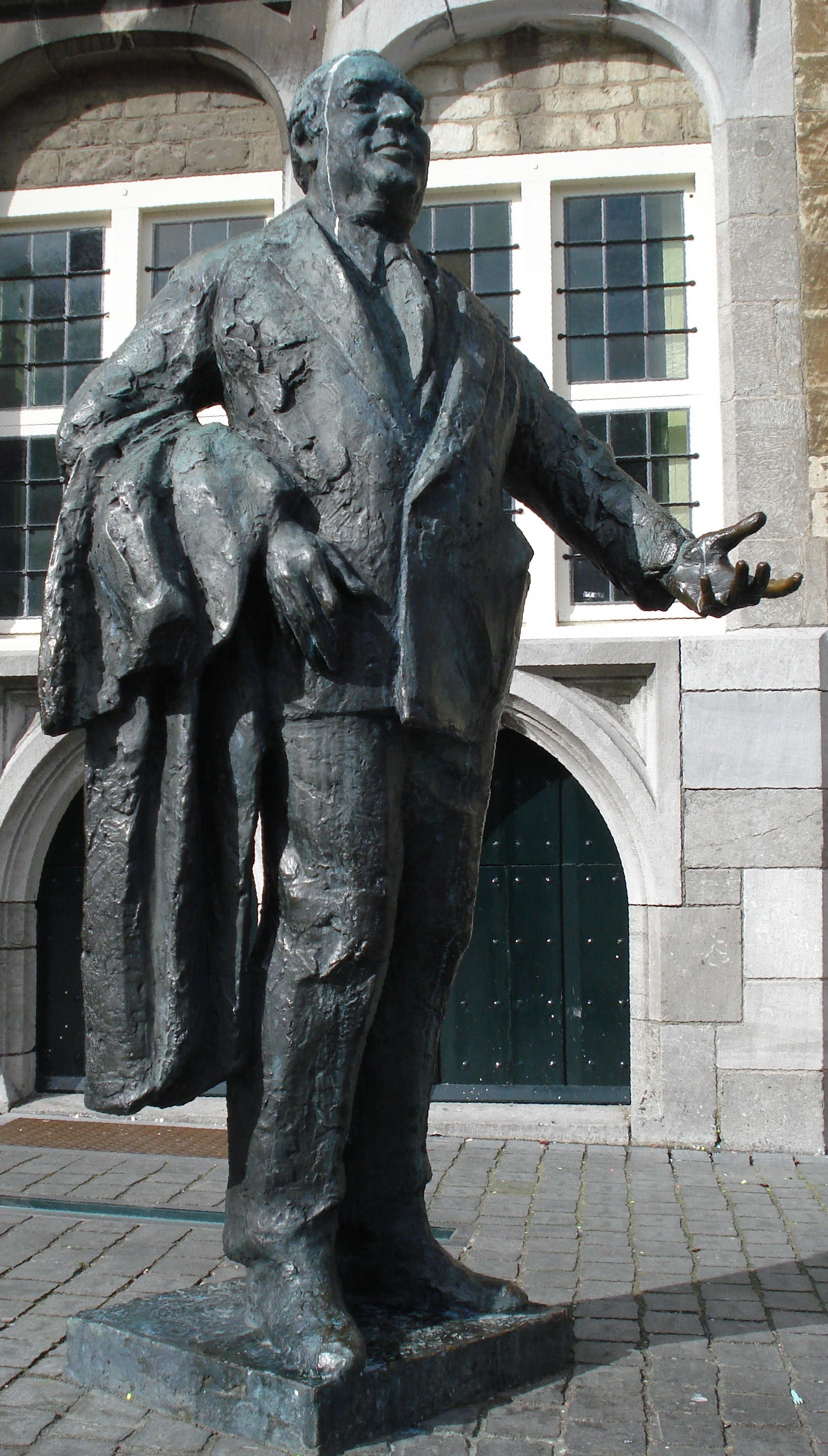
Statue of Anton van Duinkerken in his birthplace Bergen op Zoom

Wilhelmus Johannes Maria Antonius Asselbergs (2 January 1903 in Bergen op Zoom – 27 June 1968 in Nijmegen), better known under his pseudonym Anton van Duinkerken, was a Dutch poet, essayist, and academic.

Asselbergs considered a career as a priest before becoming a journalist, editing De Gids. He was subsequently a professor in art history and the history of literature at the Katholieke Universiteit Nijmegen. A Roman Catholic, he was active on behalf of the emancipation of the Catholic Church and wrote religious poetry.

In 1954 he became member of the Royal Netherlands Academy of Arts and Sciences.

He was honoured with a statue in the city of Bergen op Zoom.
