= Jan de Quay =

Prime Minister of the Netherlands from 1959 to 1963

His Excellency Jan de Quay
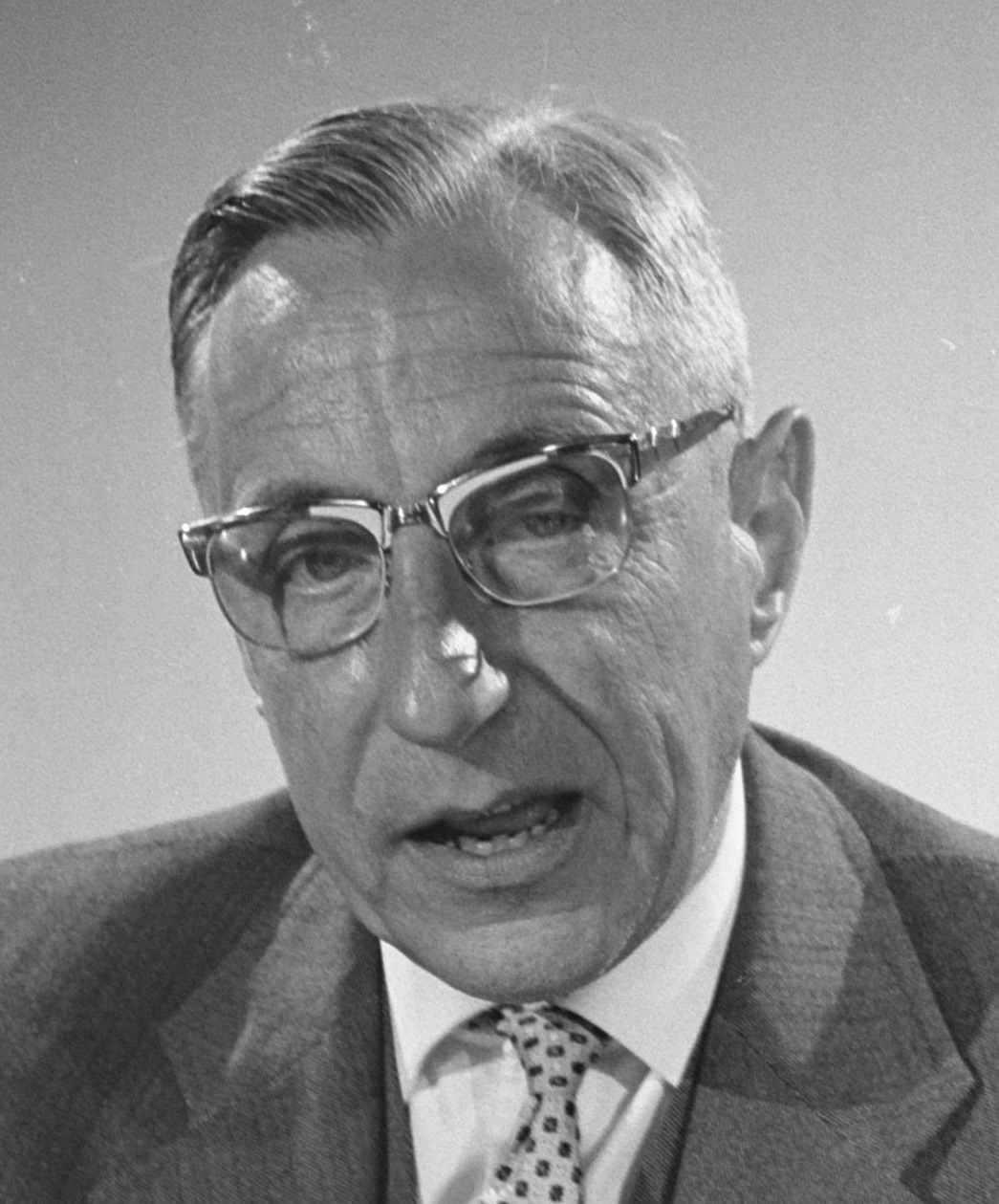
- De Quay in 1962

Prime Minister of the Netherlands
- In office 19 May 1959 – 24 July 1963
- Monarch: Juliana
- Deputy: See list: Henk Korthals Norbert Schmelzer as State Secretary for General Affairs
- Preceded by: Louis Beel
- Succeeded by: Victor Marijnen

Deputy Prime Minister of the Netherlands
- In office 22 November 1966 – 5 April 1967 Serving with Barend Biesheuvel
- Prime Minister: Jelle Zijlstra
- Preceded by: Anne Vondeling; Barend Biesheuvel
- Succeeded by: Johan Witteveen; Joop Bakker

Minister of Transport and Water Management
- In office 22 November 1966 – 5 April 1967
- Prime Minister: Jelle Zijlstra
- Preceded by: Ko Suurhoff
- Succeeded by: Joop Bakker

Member of the Senate
- In office 13 June 1967 – 16 September 1969
- In office 25 June 1963 – 22 November 1966

Minister of Defence
- In office 1 August 1959 – 4 September 1959; Ad interim
- Prime Minister: Himself
- Preceded by: Sidney J. van den Bergh
- Succeeded by: Sim Visser

Queen's Commissioner of North Brabant
- In office 1 November 1946 – 19 May 1959
- Monarchs: Wilhelmina (1946–1948); Juliana (1948–1959)
- Preceded by: Johannes Smits van Oyen
- Succeeded by: Constant Kortmann

Minister of War
- In office 4 April 1945 – 25 June 1945
- Prime Minister: Pieter Sjoerds Gerbrandy
- Preceded by: Jim de Booy (Ad interim)
- Succeeded by: Jo Meynen

Personal details
- Born: Jan Eduard de Quay; 26 August 1901 's-Hertogenbosch, Netherlands
- Died: 4 July 1985 (aged 83) Beers, Netherlands
- Party: Christian Democratic Appeal (from 1980)
- Other political affiliations: Catholic People's Party (1945–1980); Roman Catholic State Party (until 1945)
- Spouse: Maria van der Lande (m. 1927)
- Children: 5 sons and 4 daughters
- Education: Utrecht University
- Occupation: Politician · Psychologist · Sociologist · Researcher · Management consultant · Academic administrator · Author · Professor

Military service
- Allegiance: Netherlands
- Branch/service: Royal Netherlands Army
- Years of service: 1939–1940 (Conscription); 1944–1948 (Reserve)
- Rank: Major
- Unit: Medical Services
- Battles/wars: World War II; Battle of the Netherlands; Battle of France; Operation Pheasant

Jan Eduard de Quay (Dutch: [ˈjɑn ˈeːdyʋɑrt də ˈkʋaːi]; 26 August 1901 – 4 July 1985) was a Dutch politician of the defunct Catholic People's Party (KVP) now the Christian Democratic Appeal (CDA) party and psychologist who served as Prime Minister of the Netherlands from 19 May 1959 until 24 July 1963.

De Quay studied Applied psychology and Literature at the Utrecht University obtaining Master of Psychology and Letters degree's followed by a postgraduate education in Clinical Psychology at the Stanford University obtaining a Master of Social Science degree and worked as a researcher and associate professor of Applied psychology at the University of Tilburg from September 1927 until August 1939 before finishing his thesis at his alma and graduated as a Doctor of Psychology in Applied psychology and worked as a professor of Applied psychology, business administration and business theory at the University of Tilburg from March 1933 until August 1939. De Quay also served as Rector Magnificus of the university from January 1938 until January 1939. During World War II De Quay was co-founder of the controversial Dutch Union in July 1940 but the organisation was disbanded by the German occupation authority in December 1941. Shortly before the end of the War De Quay was appointed as Minister of War in the Cabinet Gerbrandy III, the last government-in-exile taking office on 4 April 1945. After a cabinet formation De Quay was not included in the new cabinet. De Quay continued to be active in politics and in September 1946 was nominated as the next Queen's Commissioner of North Brabant taking office on 1 November 1946. After the election of 1959 De Quay was persuaded to lead a new cabinet. Following a successful cabinet formation De Quay formed the Cabinet De Quay and became Prime Minister of the Netherlands taking office on 19 May 1959.

Before the election of 1963 De Quay indicated that he would not serve another term as Prime Minister or not stand for the election. De Quay left office following the installation of the Cabinet Marijnen on 24 July 1963. De Quay was elected as a Member of the Senate after the Senate election of 1963 taking office on 25 June 1963 serving as a frontbencher and spokesperson for Foreign Affairs. After the Night of Schmelzer De Quay was appointed as Deputy Prime Minister and Minister of Transport and Water Management in the caretaker Cabinet Zijlstra taking office on 22 November 1966. Shortly thereafter De Quay announced that he would decline to serve in new cabinet and returned to the Senate serving from 13 June 1967 until 16 September 1969.

De Quay retired from active politics at 68 and became active in the private and public sectors as a corporate and non-profit director and served on several state commissions and councils on behalf of the government. De Quay was known for his abilities as an effective team leader and consensus builder. During his premiership, his cabinet was responsible for major reforms to the education system, the public sector, social security and dealing with several major crises such as the West New Guinea dispute. De Quay withdrew from public life and lived in retirement until his death in July 1985 at the age of 83. He holds the distinction as the leading the first cabinet to have completed a full term after World War II and his premiership is consistently regarded both by scholars and the public to have been average.

== Biography ==
=== Early life ===
Jan Eduard de Quay was born in ’s-Hertogenbosch on 26 August 1901. After attending a Jesuit school in Katwijk, he graduated in psychology from the University of Utrecht in 1926. The following year he was awarded a doctorate for his thesis on the contribution of sensory and motor factors to the learning and labour process.

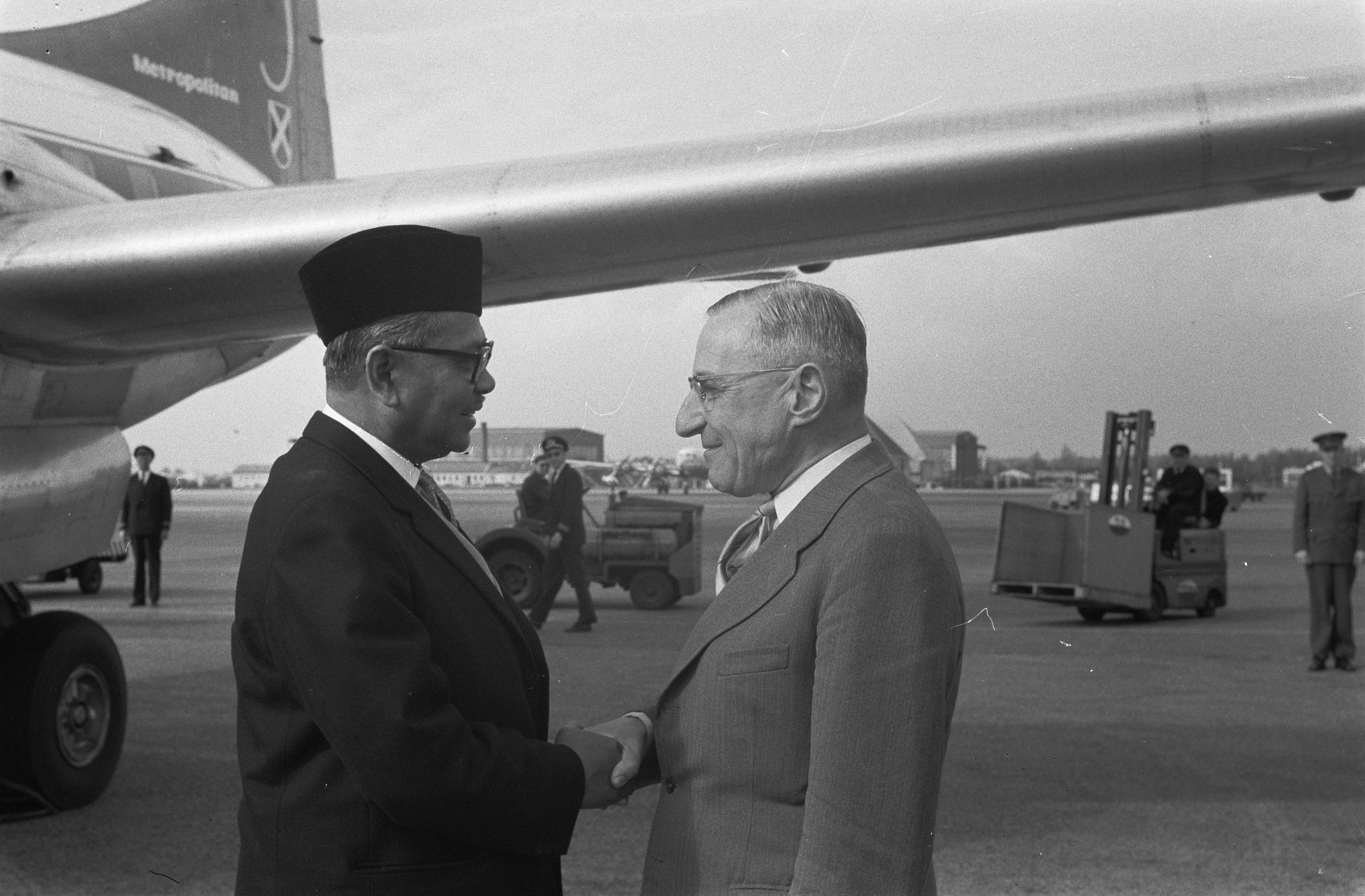
Prime Minister of Malaysia Tunku Abdul Rahman and Prime Minister Jan de Quay at Airport Schiphol on 26 May 1960.

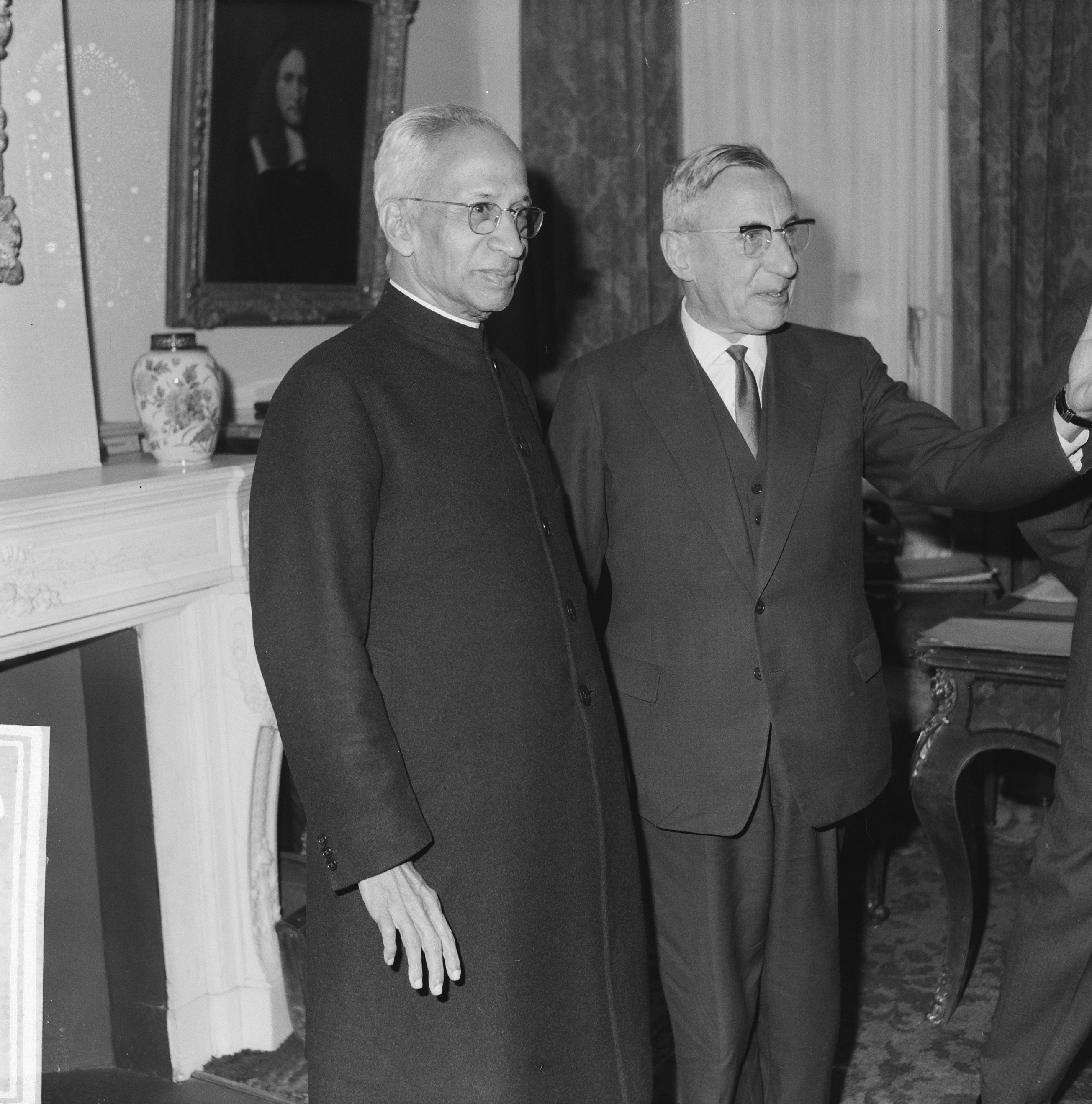
Vice President of India Sarvepalli Radhakrishnan and Prime Minister Jan de Quay at a meeting at the Ministry of General Affairs on 18 October 1961.

In 1928 he was appointed lecturer in psychotechnology at the Catholic college of higher education in Tilburg (now the University of Tilburg) and in 1933 professor of business economics and psychotechnology at the same institution. During the pre-war mobilisation of the Netherlands (1939–1940) De Quay became a lieutenant in the reserve. In July 1940 he formed the Triumvirate of the controversial nationalist Dutch Union with Louis Einthoven and Hans Linthorst Homan. This Union was controversial because its leaders suggested partial collaboration with the German occupiers. In August 1940 De Quay started secret meetings with the fascistic Nationaal Front in order to fuse the two organisations. During these talks De Quay called himself a fascist, the Union a fascistic organisation and said that he rejected democracy. In May and June of the same year he was government commissioner for labour at the Ministry of Social Affairs. In this position he encouraged the Dutch population to seek employment in Germany. From July 1942 to June 1943 he was interned in Haaren, after which he went into hiding from the occupation authorities. This lasted until June 1943, when he went into hiding. Following the liberation of the area south of the rivers in late 1944, he became chairman of the Board of Commissioners for Agriculture, Industry, Trade and Commerce set up to restore the national economy.

=== Politics ===
From 5 April until 23 June 1945, De Quay was Minister of War in the second Gerbrandy cabinet. On 1 November 1946 he became Queen's Commissioner of North Brabant until 19 May 1959.

He served as Prime Minister of the Netherlands from 19 May 1959 until 24 July 1963. The free Saturday was introduced (for civil servants, in 1961), as well as laws for education (mammoetwet), unemployment benefit (bijstandwet) and child benefit (kinderbijslagwet). Natural gas was discovered in Slochteren, which would later turn out to be one of the biggest gas reserves in the world and a major source of income for the Netherlands in the decades to come. On 23 December 1960 the cabinet fell over extra public housing (woningwetwoningen), but Gaius de Gaay Fortman reconciled matters and the cabinet resumed on 2 January 1961. In August/September 1962, New Guinea was handed over to Indonesia, under supervision of the UN.

Shortly after the installation of the new government, minister of defence Ven den Bergh resigned for personal reasons (family affairs with his United States wife and children). In 1962, the new minister of defence Visser also had to resign after protests against his dismissal of a critical civil servant. In 1961 minister Van Rooy of social affairs resigned after criticism of how he dealt with the new child benefit law. His post was taken over by former state secretary Veldkamp, whose now vacant former position in turn was taken over by Gijzels. In 1963, a proposal to install commercial television was not accepted.

He served as a Member of the Senate from 25 June 1963 until 22 November 1966. During the Cabinet Zijlstra he served as Minister of Transport, Public Works and Water Management and Deputy Prime Minister from 22 November 1966 until 5 April 1967. On 13 June 1967 he again was a Member of the Senate until 16 September 1969.

== Personal life ==
On 8 August 1927, De Quay married Maria van der Lande (29 August 1901 – 6 November 1988). De Quay died on 4 July 1985 in Beers, he was 83.

== Decorations ==
Honours
| Ribbon bar | Honour | Country | Date | Comment |
| | Knight of the Order of the Holy Sepulchre | Holy See | | |
| | Grand Officer of the Order of Orange-Nassau | Netherlands | 27 July 1963 | Elevated from Commander (29 April 1959) |
| | Commander of the Order of the Netherlands Lion | Netherlands | 27 April 1967 | Elevated from Knight (17 September 1946) |

Political offices
| Preceded by Jim de Booy; Ad interim | Minister of War; 1945 | Succeeded by Jo Meynen |
| Preceded by Johannes Smits van Oyen | Queen's Commissioner of North Brabant; 1946–1959 | Succeeded by Constant Kortmann |
| Preceded by Louis Beel | Minister of General Affairs; 1959–1963 | Succeeded by Victor Marijnen |
| Preceded by Louis Beel | Prime Minister of the Netherlands; 1959–1963 | Succeeded by Victor Marijnen |
| Preceded by Sidney J. van den Bergh | Minister of Defence; Ad interim 1959 | Succeeded by Sim Visser |
| Preceded by Anne Vondeling | Deputy Prime Minister; 1966–1967; With: Barend Biesheuvel | Succeeded by Johan Witteveen |
| Preceded by Barend Biesheuvel | Deputy Prime Minister; 1966–1967; With: Barend Biesheuvel | Succeeded by Joop Bakker |
| Preceded by Ko Suurhoff | Minister of Transport and Water Management; 1966–1967 | Succeeded by Joop Bakker |
Academic offices
| Preceded by Martinus Cobbenhagen | Rector Magnificus of the Tilburg University; 1938–1939 | Succeeded by Hendrik Kaag |
