= Breakthrough (Dutch political history) =

The Breakthrough (Dutch: Doorbraak) was a short-lived political movement in the Netherlands after World War II, with the stated goal of renewing the politics of the Netherlands by coalescing progressive liberals, Christian democrats and social democrats in a single progressive political party. In the process, the movement sought to 'break through' the pillarisation in Dutch politics. This led to the creation of the modern day Labour Party.

The breakthrough idea originated during World War II in Kamp Sint-Michielsgestel, where prominent members of the Dutch elite were interned and discussed political and social questions. Many sought to break with the parochialism of pre-War politics, which was characterised by pillarisation and rigid voting behaviour largely determined by religious affiliation or socio-economic position, reinforced by the notion of antithesis. The political order that would follow the Netherlands' liberation would need a new foundation, one in which religious and socio-economic divides were bridged and political differences were programmatic in nature. The goal of this "breakthrough" was to unleash a spirit of national unity, spiritual renewal, and cooperation between labour, capital and the state, which was captured in the ambiguous term "personalist socialism".

In order to force this breakthrough, the Social Democratic Workers' Party, the left-liberal Free-thinking Democratic League and the Christian socialist Christian Democratic Union united to form the Labour Party (PvdA) in May 1946, a progressive party open to all people. However, much of the pre-War party system re-emerged around the same time. The Anti-Revolutionary Party and the Christian Historical Union were reestablished, while the Roman Catholic State Party was reformed into the Catholic People's Party, with the endorsement of Roman Catholic clergy. The Liberal State Party was reestablished as the Freedom Party, and in January 1948, much of the PvdA's liberal wing under the leadership of Pieter Oud left the party and fused with the Freedom Party to form the People's Party for Freedom and Democracy. This left the PvdA to become encapsulated in the socialist pillar.

== See also ==
- People's party (politics)
- Polarisation strategy
